

388001–388100 

|-bgcolor=#d6d6d6
| 388001 ||  || — || August 28, 2005 || Kitt Peak || Spacewatch || — || align=right | 2.1 km || 
|-id=002 bgcolor=#fefefe
| 388002 ||  || — || August 28, 2005 || Kitt Peak || Spacewatch || V || align=right data-sort-value="0.55" | 550 m || 
|-id=003 bgcolor=#d6d6d6
| 388003 ||  || — || August 28, 2005 || Kitt Peak || Spacewatch || — || align=right | 3.8 km || 
|-id=004 bgcolor=#d6d6d6
| 388004 ||  || — || August 28, 2005 || Kitt Peak || Spacewatch || VER || align=right | 2.4 km || 
|-id=005 bgcolor=#fefefe
| 388005 ||  || — || August 29, 2005 || Anderson Mesa || LONEOS || FLO || align=right data-sort-value="0.79" | 790 m || 
|-id=006 bgcolor=#fefefe
| 388006 ||  || — || August 29, 2005 || Palomar || NEAT || — || align=right data-sort-value="0.75" | 750 m || 
|-id=007 bgcolor=#fefefe
| 388007 ||  || — || August 31, 2005 || Palomar || NEAT || NYS || align=right data-sort-value="0.72" | 720 m || 
|-id=008 bgcolor=#d6d6d6
| 388008 ||  || — || August 25, 2005 || Palomar || NEAT || — || align=right | 3.1 km || 
|-id=009 bgcolor=#d6d6d6
| 388009 ||  || — || August 29, 2005 || Kitt Peak || Spacewatch || — || align=right | 2.5 km || 
|-id=010 bgcolor=#d6d6d6
| 388010 ||  || — || August 25, 2005 || Palomar || NEAT || — || align=right | 2.8 km || 
|-id=011 bgcolor=#fefefe
| 388011 ||  || — || September 11, 2005 || Kitt Peak || Spacewatch || MAS || align=right data-sort-value="0.53" | 530 m || 
|-id=012 bgcolor=#d6d6d6
| 388012 ||  || — || September 3, 2005 || Mauna Kea || C. Veillet || — || align=right | 3.3 km || 
|-id=013 bgcolor=#fefefe
| 388013 ||  || — || September 13, 2005 || Kitt Peak || Spacewatch || — || align=right data-sort-value="0.70" | 700 m || 
|-id=014 bgcolor=#fefefe
| 388014 ||  || — || September 13, 2005 || Catalina || CSS || V || align=right data-sort-value="0.75" | 750 m || 
|-id=015 bgcolor=#d6d6d6
| 388015 ||  || — || September 24, 2005 || Kitt Peak || Spacewatch || EUP || align=right | 4.1 km || 
|-id=016 bgcolor=#fefefe
| 388016 ||  || — || August 31, 2005 || Kitt Peak || Spacewatch || — || align=right data-sort-value="0.82" | 820 m || 
|-id=017 bgcolor=#fefefe
| 388017 ||  || — || September 26, 2005 || Kitt Peak || Spacewatch || — || align=right data-sort-value="0.73" | 730 m || 
|-id=018 bgcolor=#fefefe
| 388018 ||  || — || September 29, 2005 || Wrightwood || J. W. Young || PHO || align=right data-sort-value="0.81" | 810 m || 
|-id=019 bgcolor=#fefefe
| 388019 ||  || — || September 23, 2005 || Kitt Peak || Spacewatch || NYS || align=right data-sort-value="0.68" | 680 m || 
|-id=020 bgcolor=#d6d6d6
| 388020 ||  || — || September 23, 2005 || Kitt Peak || Spacewatch || — || align=right | 3.2 km || 
|-id=021 bgcolor=#d6d6d6
| 388021 ||  || — || September 24, 2005 || Kitt Peak || Spacewatch || — || align=right | 3.0 km || 
|-id=022 bgcolor=#fefefe
| 388022 ||  || — || September 24, 2005 || Kitt Peak || Spacewatch || MAS || align=right data-sort-value="0.62" | 620 m || 
|-id=023 bgcolor=#d6d6d6
| 388023 ||  || — || September 24, 2005 || Kitt Peak || Spacewatch || MEL || align=right | 4.6 km || 
|-id=024 bgcolor=#fefefe
| 388024 ||  || — || September 24, 2005 || Kitt Peak || Spacewatch || FLO || align=right data-sort-value="0.77" | 770 m || 
|-id=025 bgcolor=#fefefe
| 388025 ||  || — || September 25, 2005 || Kitt Peak || Spacewatch || — || align=right data-sort-value="0.94" | 940 m || 
|-id=026 bgcolor=#fefefe
| 388026 ||  || — || August 29, 2005 || Socorro || LINEAR || — || align=right | 1.00 km || 
|-id=027 bgcolor=#d6d6d6
| 388027 ||  || — || September 27, 2005 || Kitt Peak || Spacewatch || — || align=right | 4.8 km || 
|-id=028 bgcolor=#fefefe
| 388028 ||  || — || September 24, 2005 || Kitt Peak || Spacewatch || — || align=right data-sort-value="0.68" | 680 m || 
|-id=029 bgcolor=#d6d6d6
| 388029 ||  || — || September 24, 2005 || Kitt Peak || Spacewatch || — || align=right | 4.5 km || 
|-id=030 bgcolor=#fefefe
| 388030 ||  || — || September 25, 2005 || Kitt Peak || Spacewatch || — || align=right | 2.1 km || 
|-id=031 bgcolor=#d6d6d6
| 388031 ||  || — || September 25, 2005 || Kitt Peak || Spacewatch || — || align=right | 3.7 km || 
|-id=032 bgcolor=#fefefe
| 388032 ||  || — || September 26, 2005 || Kitt Peak || Spacewatch || — || align=right data-sort-value="0.82" | 820 m || 
|-id=033 bgcolor=#fefefe
| 388033 ||  || — || September 26, 2005 || Kitt Peak || Spacewatch || — || align=right data-sort-value="0.65" | 650 m || 
|-id=034 bgcolor=#FA8072
| 388034 ||  || — || September 23, 2005 || Catalina || CSS || — || align=right data-sort-value="0.71" | 710 m || 
|-id=035 bgcolor=#d6d6d6
| 388035 ||  || — || September 29, 2005 || Mount Lemmon || Mount Lemmon Survey || TIR || align=right | 4.9 km || 
|-id=036 bgcolor=#fefefe
| 388036 ||  || — || September 30, 2005 || Junk Bond || D. Healy || MAS || align=right data-sort-value="0.63" | 630 m || 
|-id=037 bgcolor=#fefefe
| 388037 ||  || — || September 25, 2005 || Palomar || NEAT || MAS || align=right data-sort-value="0.78" | 780 m || 
|-id=038 bgcolor=#fefefe
| 388038 ||  || — || September 25, 2005 || Kitt Peak || Spacewatch || V || align=right data-sort-value="0.67" | 670 m || 
|-id=039 bgcolor=#fefefe
| 388039 ||  || — || September 25, 2005 || Palomar || NEAT || — || align=right data-sort-value="0.97" | 970 m || 
|-id=040 bgcolor=#fefefe
| 388040 ||  || — || September 27, 2005 || Kitt Peak || Spacewatch || — || align=right data-sort-value="0.78" | 780 m || 
|-id=041 bgcolor=#fefefe
| 388041 ||  || — || September 29, 2005 || Kitt Peak || Spacewatch || NYS || align=right data-sort-value="0.63" | 630 m || 
|-id=042 bgcolor=#fefefe
| 388042 ||  || — || September 29, 2005 || Catalina || CSS || — || align=right | 1.1 km || 
|-id=043 bgcolor=#fefefe
| 388043 ||  || — || September 30, 2005 || Palomar || NEAT || — || align=right | 1.1 km || 
|-id=044 bgcolor=#fefefe
| 388044 ||  || — || September 30, 2005 || Mount Lemmon || Mount Lemmon Survey || — || align=right data-sort-value="0.86" | 860 m || 
|-id=045 bgcolor=#fefefe
| 388045 ||  || — || September 30, 2005 || Palomar || NEAT || — || align=right data-sort-value="0.83" | 830 m || 
|-id=046 bgcolor=#fefefe
| 388046 ||  || — || September 30, 2005 || Mount Lemmon || Mount Lemmon Survey || MAS || align=right data-sort-value="0.54" | 540 m || 
|-id=047 bgcolor=#fefefe
| 388047 ||  || — || September 30, 2005 || Mount Lemmon || Mount Lemmon Survey || NYS || align=right data-sort-value="0.76" | 760 m || 
|-id=048 bgcolor=#d6d6d6
| 388048 ||  || — || September 30, 2005 || Kitt Peak || Spacewatch || — || align=right | 4.1 km || 
|-id=049 bgcolor=#fefefe
| 388049 ||  || — || September 29, 2005 || Mount Lemmon || Mount Lemmon Survey || NYS || align=right data-sort-value="0.67" | 670 m || 
|-id=050 bgcolor=#fefefe
| 388050 ||  || — || September 26, 2005 || Kitt Peak || Spacewatch || FLO || align=right data-sort-value="0.67" | 670 m || 
|-id=051 bgcolor=#fefefe
| 388051 ||  || — || September 24, 2005 || Kitt Peak || Spacewatch || FLO || align=right data-sort-value="0.43" | 430 m || 
|-id=052 bgcolor=#fefefe
| 388052 ||  || — || September 29, 2005 || Catalina || CSS || — || align=right data-sort-value="0.84" | 840 m || 
|-id=053 bgcolor=#d6d6d6
| 388053 ||  || — || September 27, 2005 || Apache Point || A. C. Becker || — || align=right | 4.5 km || 
|-id=054 bgcolor=#fefefe
| 388054 ||  || — || September 30, 2005 || Mount Lemmon || Mount Lemmon Survey || FLO || align=right data-sort-value="0.70" | 700 m || 
|-id=055 bgcolor=#d6d6d6
| 388055 ||  || — || October 2, 2005 || Mount Lemmon || Mount Lemmon Survey || — || align=right | 5.1 km || 
|-id=056 bgcolor=#fefefe
| 388056 ||  || — || October 1, 2005 || Anderson Mesa || LONEOS || — || align=right data-sort-value="0.86" | 860 m || 
|-id=057 bgcolor=#fefefe
| 388057 ||  || — || October 7, 2005 || Andrushivka || Andrushivka Obs. || — || align=right data-sort-value="0.96" | 960 m || 
|-id=058 bgcolor=#d6d6d6
| 388058 ||  || — || October 1, 2005 || Catalina || CSS || LIX || align=right | 4.4 km || 
|-id=059 bgcolor=#fefefe
| 388059 ||  || — || October 6, 2005 || Catalina || CSS || PHO || align=right | 1.5 km || 
|-id=060 bgcolor=#fefefe
| 388060 ||  || — || October 5, 2005 || Mount Lemmon || Mount Lemmon Survey || — || align=right | 1.4 km || 
|-id=061 bgcolor=#fefefe
| 388061 ||  || — || October 3, 2005 || Socorro || LINEAR || — || align=right data-sort-value="0.75" | 750 m || 
|-id=062 bgcolor=#fefefe
| 388062 ||  || — || October 5, 2005 || Kitt Peak || Spacewatch || MAS || align=right data-sort-value="0.72" | 720 m || 
|-id=063 bgcolor=#fefefe
| 388063 ||  || — || October 7, 2005 || Kitt Peak || Spacewatch || — || align=right | 1.3 km || 
|-id=064 bgcolor=#fefefe
| 388064 ||  || — || October 7, 2005 || Catalina || CSS || — || align=right data-sort-value="0.98" | 980 m || 
|-id=065 bgcolor=#fefefe
| 388065 ||  || — || October 8, 2005 || Kitt Peak || Spacewatch || — || align=right data-sort-value="0.87" | 870 m || 
|-id=066 bgcolor=#fefefe
| 388066 ||  || — || September 29, 2005 || Kitt Peak || Spacewatch || V || align=right data-sort-value="0.62" | 620 m || 
|-id=067 bgcolor=#fefefe
| 388067 ||  || — || September 29, 2005 || Mount Lemmon || Mount Lemmon Survey || V || align=right data-sort-value="0.56" | 560 m || 
|-id=068 bgcolor=#fefefe
| 388068 ||  || — || October 22, 2005 || Kitt Peak || Spacewatch || FLO || align=right data-sort-value="0.63" | 630 m || 
|-id=069 bgcolor=#fefefe
| 388069 ||  || — || October 14, 2005 || Anderson Mesa || LONEOS || NYS || align=right data-sort-value="0.85" | 850 m || 
|-id=070 bgcolor=#fefefe
| 388070 ||  || — || October 23, 2005 || Kitt Peak || Spacewatch || V || align=right data-sort-value="0.82" | 820 m || 
|-id=071 bgcolor=#fefefe
| 388071 ||  || — || October 23, 2005 || Kitt Peak || Spacewatch || — || align=right data-sort-value="0.79" | 790 m || 
|-id=072 bgcolor=#fefefe
| 388072 ||  || — || October 23, 2005 || Catalina || CSS || — || align=right | 1.0 km || 
|-id=073 bgcolor=#fefefe
| 388073 ||  || — || October 22, 2005 || Kitt Peak || Spacewatch || MAS || align=right data-sort-value="0.67" | 670 m || 
|-id=074 bgcolor=#fefefe
| 388074 ||  || — || October 22, 2005 || Catalina || CSS || fast? || align=right data-sort-value="0.92" | 920 m || 
|-id=075 bgcolor=#fefefe
| 388075 ||  || — || October 22, 2005 || Catalina || CSS || NYS || align=right data-sort-value="0.78" | 780 m || 
|-id=076 bgcolor=#fefefe
| 388076 ||  || — || September 30, 2005 || Catalina || CSS || — || align=right | 1.0 km || 
|-id=077 bgcolor=#fefefe
| 388077 ||  || — || October 23, 2005 || Catalina || CSS || — || align=right data-sort-value="0.88" | 880 m || 
|-id=078 bgcolor=#fefefe
| 388078 ||  || — || October 25, 2005 || Mount Lemmon || Mount Lemmon Survey || — || align=right data-sort-value="0.75" | 750 m || 
|-id=079 bgcolor=#fefefe
| 388079 ||  || — || October 23, 2005 || Palomar || NEAT || — || align=right data-sort-value="0.90" | 900 m || 
|-id=080 bgcolor=#fefefe
| 388080 ||  || — || October 23, 2005 || Catalina || CSS || — || align=right | 1.5 km || 
|-id=081 bgcolor=#fefefe
| 388081 ||  || — || October 3, 2005 || Socorro || LINEAR || — || align=right | 1.1 km || 
|-id=082 bgcolor=#fefefe
| 388082 ||  || — || October 22, 2005 || Kitt Peak || Spacewatch || — || align=right data-sort-value="0.77" | 770 m || 
|-id=083 bgcolor=#fefefe
| 388083 ||  || — || October 22, 2005 || Kitt Peak || Spacewatch || MAS || align=right data-sort-value="0.70" | 700 m || 
|-id=084 bgcolor=#d6d6d6
| 388084 ||  || — || October 22, 2005 || Kitt Peak || Spacewatch || — || align=right | 3.6 km || 
|-id=085 bgcolor=#fefefe
| 388085 ||  || — || October 22, 2005 || Kitt Peak || Spacewatch || — || align=right data-sort-value="0.75" | 750 m || 
|-id=086 bgcolor=#fefefe
| 388086 ||  || — || October 22, 2005 || Kitt Peak || Spacewatch || FLO || align=right data-sort-value="0.71" | 710 m || 
|-id=087 bgcolor=#fefefe
| 388087 ||  || — || October 24, 2005 || Kitt Peak || Spacewatch || — || align=right data-sort-value="0.74" | 740 m || 
|-id=088 bgcolor=#fefefe
| 388088 ||  || — || October 26, 2005 || Kitt Peak || Spacewatch || V || align=right data-sort-value="0.75" | 750 m || 
|-id=089 bgcolor=#fefefe
| 388089 ||  || — || October 27, 2005 || Kitt Peak || Spacewatch || — || align=right data-sort-value="0.69" | 690 m || 
|-id=090 bgcolor=#fefefe
| 388090 ||  || — || October 25, 2005 || Anderson Mesa || LONEOS || NYS || align=right data-sort-value="0.79" | 790 m || 
|-id=091 bgcolor=#fefefe
| 388091 ||  || — || October 26, 2005 || Kitt Peak || Spacewatch || — || align=right | 1.0 km || 
|-id=092 bgcolor=#fefefe
| 388092 ||  || — || October 27, 2005 || Socorro || LINEAR || — || align=right | 1.1 km || 
|-id=093 bgcolor=#fefefe
| 388093 ||  || — || October 25, 2005 || Kitt Peak || Spacewatch || NYS || align=right data-sort-value="0.69" | 690 m || 
|-id=094 bgcolor=#fefefe
| 388094 ||  || — || October 26, 2005 || Kitt Peak || Spacewatch || V || align=right data-sort-value="0.70" | 700 m || 
|-id=095 bgcolor=#fefefe
| 388095 ||  || — || October 26, 2005 || Kitt Peak || Spacewatch || NYS || align=right data-sort-value="0.63" | 630 m || 
|-id=096 bgcolor=#fefefe
| 388096 ||  || — || October 28, 2005 || Mount Lemmon || Mount Lemmon Survey || V || align=right data-sort-value="0.80" | 800 m || 
|-id=097 bgcolor=#fefefe
| 388097 ||  || — || October 26, 2005 || Kitt Peak || Spacewatch || — || align=right data-sort-value="0.75" | 750 m || 
|-id=098 bgcolor=#fefefe
| 388098 ||  || — || October 26, 2005 || Kitt Peak || Spacewatch || V || align=right data-sort-value="0.63" | 630 m || 
|-id=099 bgcolor=#fefefe
| 388099 ||  || — || October 26, 2005 || Kitt Peak || Spacewatch || — || align=right data-sort-value="0.93" | 930 m || 
|-id=100 bgcolor=#fefefe
| 388100 ||  || — || October 26, 2005 || Kitt Peak || Spacewatch || — || align=right data-sort-value="0.69" | 690 m || 
|}

388101–388200 

|-bgcolor=#d6d6d6
| 388101 ||  || — || October 26, 2005 || Kitt Peak || Spacewatch || — || align=right | 3.8 km || 
|-id=102 bgcolor=#fefefe
| 388102 ||  || — || October 26, 2005 || Kitt Peak || Spacewatch || — || align=right | 1.1 km || 
|-id=103 bgcolor=#fefefe
| 388103 ||  || — || October 27, 2005 || Kitt Peak || Spacewatch || NYS || align=right data-sort-value="0.66" | 660 m || 
|-id=104 bgcolor=#fefefe
| 388104 ||  || — || October 29, 2005 || Catalina || CSS || FLO || align=right data-sort-value="0.81" | 810 m || 
|-id=105 bgcolor=#fefefe
| 388105 ||  || — || October 31, 2005 || Kitt Peak || Spacewatch || ERI || align=right | 2.3 km || 
|-id=106 bgcolor=#fefefe
| 388106 ||  || — || October 31, 2005 || Kitt Peak || Spacewatch || — || align=right data-sort-value="0.79" | 790 m || 
|-id=107 bgcolor=#fefefe
| 388107 ||  || — || October 23, 2005 || Catalina || CSS || — || align=right | 1.1 km || 
|-id=108 bgcolor=#fefefe
| 388108 ||  || — || October 23, 2005 || Catalina || CSS || — || align=right data-sort-value="0.97" | 970 m || 
|-id=109 bgcolor=#fefefe
| 388109 ||  || — || October 27, 2005 || Kitt Peak || Spacewatch || — || align=right data-sort-value="0.85" | 850 m || 
|-id=110 bgcolor=#fefefe
| 388110 ||  || — || October 27, 2005 || Mount Lemmon || Mount Lemmon Survey || MAS || align=right data-sort-value="0.73" | 730 m || 
|-id=111 bgcolor=#fefefe
| 388111 ||  || — || October 27, 2005 || Socorro || LINEAR || — || align=right | 1.9 km || 
|-id=112 bgcolor=#fefefe
| 388112 ||  || — || October 28, 2005 || Kitt Peak || Spacewatch || NYS || align=right data-sort-value="0.76" | 760 m || 
|-id=113 bgcolor=#fefefe
| 388113 ||  || — || October 28, 2005 || Catalina || CSS || NYSfast? || align=right data-sort-value="0.72" | 720 m || 
|-id=114 bgcolor=#fefefe
| 388114 ||  || — || October 31, 2005 || Mount Lemmon || Mount Lemmon Survey || — || align=right data-sort-value="0.75" | 750 m || 
|-id=115 bgcolor=#fefefe
| 388115 ||  || — || October 25, 2005 || Kitt Peak || Spacewatch || V || align=right data-sort-value="0.76" | 760 m || 
|-id=116 bgcolor=#fefefe
| 388116 ||  || — || October 28, 2005 || Kitt Peak || Spacewatch || V || align=right data-sort-value="0.82" | 820 m || 
|-id=117 bgcolor=#fefefe
| 388117 ||  || — || October 28, 2005 || Kitt Peak || Spacewatch || MAS || align=right data-sort-value="0.75" | 750 m || 
|-id=118 bgcolor=#fefefe
| 388118 ||  || — || October 28, 2005 || Kitt Peak || Spacewatch || NYS || align=right data-sort-value="0.54" | 540 m || 
|-id=119 bgcolor=#fefefe
| 388119 ||  || — || October 30, 2005 || Socorro || LINEAR || V || align=right data-sort-value="0.74" | 740 m || 
|-id=120 bgcolor=#fefefe
| 388120 ||  || — || October 29, 2005 || Kitt Peak || Spacewatch || FLO || align=right data-sort-value="0.56" | 560 m || 
|-id=121 bgcolor=#fefefe
| 388121 ||  || — || October 30, 2005 || Kitt Peak || Spacewatch || MAS || align=right data-sort-value="0.64" | 640 m || 
|-id=122 bgcolor=#fefefe
| 388122 ||  || — || October 30, 2005 || Kitt Peak || Spacewatch || — || align=right data-sort-value="0.62" | 620 m || 
|-id=123 bgcolor=#fefefe
| 388123 ||  || — || October 24, 2005 || Anderson Mesa || LONEOS || NYS || align=right data-sort-value="0.59" | 590 m || 
|-id=124 bgcolor=#fefefe
| 388124 ||  || — || October 26, 2005 || Kitt Peak || Spacewatch || V || align=right data-sort-value="0.74" | 740 m || 
|-id=125 bgcolor=#fefefe
| 388125 ||  || — || October 22, 2005 || Palomar || NEAT || NYS || align=right data-sort-value="0.58" | 580 m || 
|-id=126 bgcolor=#d6d6d6
| 388126 ||  || — || October 25, 2005 || Mount Lemmon || Mount Lemmon Survey || 7:4 || align=right | 5.1 km || 
|-id=127 bgcolor=#d6d6d6
| 388127 ||  || — || October 27, 2005 || Apache Point || A. C. Becker || HYG || align=right | 3.3 km || 
|-id=128 bgcolor=#fefefe
| 388128 ||  || — || November 1, 2005 || Kitt Peak || Spacewatch || — || align=right data-sort-value="0.70" | 700 m || 
|-id=129 bgcolor=#fefefe
| 388129 ||  || — || November 2, 2005 || Mount Lemmon || Mount Lemmon Survey || NYS || align=right data-sort-value="0.81" | 810 m || 
|-id=130 bgcolor=#fefefe
| 388130 ||  || — || November 3, 2005 || Kitt Peak || Spacewatch || NYS || align=right data-sort-value="0.63" | 630 m || 
|-id=131 bgcolor=#fefefe
| 388131 ||  || — || October 25, 2005 || Kitt Peak || Spacewatch || V || align=right data-sort-value="0.65" | 650 m || 
|-id=132 bgcolor=#fefefe
| 388132 ||  || — || November 6, 2005 || Mount Lemmon || Mount Lemmon Survey || NYS || align=right data-sort-value="0.68" | 680 m || 
|-id=133 bgcolor=#fefefe
| 388133 ||  || — || September 30, 2005 || Mount Lemmon || Mount Lemmon Survey || NYS || align=right data-sort-value="0.72" | 720 m || 
|-id=134 bgcolor=#fefefe
| 388134 ||  || — || November 10, 2005 || Kitt Peak || Spacewatch || NYS || align=right data-sort-value="0.68" | 680 m || 
|-id=135 bgcolor=#d6d6d6
| 388135 ||  || — || November 1, 2005 || Apache Point || A. C. Becker || HYG || align=right | 3.2 km || 
|-id=136 bgcolor=#fefefe
| 388136 ||  || — || November 19, 2005 || Palomar || NEAT || FLO || align=right data-sort-value="0.86" | 860 m || 
|-id=137 bgcolor=#fefefe
| 388137 ||  || — || November 21, 2005 || Catalina || CSS || NYS || align=right data-sort-value="0.63" | 630 m || 
|-id=138 bgcolor=#fefefe
| 388138 ||  || — || November 21, 2005 || Kitt Peak || Spacewatch || — || align=right data-sort-value="0.72" | 720 m || 
|-id=139 bgcolor=#fefefe
| 388139 ||  || — || November 6, 2005 || Mount Lemmon || Mount Lemmon Survey || NYS || align=right data-sort-value="0.60" | 600 m || 
|-id=140 bgcolor=#fefefe
| 388140 ||  || — || November 21, 2005 || Kitt Peak || Spacewatch || MAS || align=right data-sort-value="0.65" | 650 m || 
|-id=141 bgcolor=#fefefe
| 388141 ||  || — || November 21, 2005 || Kitt Peak || Spacewatch || MAS || align=right data-sort-value="0.63" | 630 m || 
|-id=142 bgcolor=#fefefe
| 388142 ||  || — || November 25, 2005 || Kitt Peak || Spacewatch || MAS || align=right data-sort-value="0.73" | 730 m || 
|-id=143 bgcolor=#fefefe
| 388143 ||  || — || November 22, 2005 || Kitt Peak || Spacewatch || MAS || align=right data-sort-value="0.66" | 660 m || 
|-id=144 bgcolor=#d6d6d6
| 388144 ||  || — || April 7, 2003 || Kitt Peak || Spacewatch || EOS || align=right | 4.0 km || 
|-id=145 bgcolor=#fefefe
| 388145 ||  || — || November 6, 2005 || Mount Lemmon || Mount Lemmon Survey || ERI || align=right | 1.5 km || 
|-id=146 bgcolor=#E9E9E9
| 388146 ||  || — || November 26, 2005 || Mount Lemmon || Mount Lemmon Survey || — || align=right | 1.2 km || 
|-id=147 bgcolor=#fefefe
| 388147 ||  || — || November 29, 2005 || Kitt Peak || Spacewatch || NYS || align=right data-sort-value="0.64" | 640 m || 
|-id=148 bgcolor=#d6d6d6
| 388148 ||  || — || November 30, 2005 || Kitt Peak || Spacewatch || 7:4 || align=right | 2.9 km || 
|-id=149 bgcolor=#fefefe
| 388149 ||  || — || November 26, 2005 || Mount Lemmon || Mount Lemmon Survey || — || align=right | 1.2 km || 
|-id=150 bgcolor=#d6d6d6
| 388150 ||  || — || October 28, 2005 || Mount Lemmon || Mount Lemmon Survey || — || align=right | 3.1 km || 
|-id=151 bgcolor=#fefefe
| 388151 ||  || — || November 25, 2005 || Mount Lemmon || Mount Lemmon Survey || — || align=right data-sort-value="0.75" | 750 m || 
|-id=152 bgcolor=#fefefe
| 388152 ||  || — || December 4, 2005 || Kitt Peak || Spacewatch || V || align=right data-sort-value="0.69" | 690 m || 
|-id=153 bgcolor=#fefefe
| 388153 ||  || — || December 2, 2005 || Kitt Peak || Spacewatch || — || align=right | 1.1 km || 
|-id=154 bgcolor=#fefefe
| 388154 ||  || — || December 21, 2005 || Kitt Peak || Spacewatch || — || align=right data-sort-value="0.99" | 990 m || 
|-id=155 bgcolor=#fefefe
| 388155 ||  || — || December 22, 2005 || Kitt Peak || Spacewatch || MAS || align=right data-sort-value="0.75" | 750 m || 
|-id=156 bgcolor=#fefefe
| 388156 ||  || — || December 23, 2005 || Kitt Peak || Spacewatch || — || align=right data-sort-value="0.96" | 960 m || 
|-id=157 bgcolor=#fefefe
| 388157 ||  || — || December 25, 2005 || Kitt Peak || Spacewatch || — || align=right data-sort-value="0.98" | 980 m || 
|-id=158 bgcolor=#fefefe
| 388158 ||  || — || December 25, 2005 || Kitt Peak || Spacewatch || — || align=right data-sort-value="0.91" | 910 m || 
|-id=159 bgcolor=#fefefe
| 388159 ||  || — || December 27, 2005 || Catalina || CSS || — || align=right | 1.9 km || 
|-id=160 bgcolor=#fefefe
| 388160 ||  || — || December 25, 2005 || Mount Lemmon || Mount Lemmon Survey || MAS || align=right data-sort-value="0.68" | 680 m || 
|-id=161 bgcolor=#fefefe
| 388161 ||  || — || December 26, 2005 || Kitt Peak || Spacewatch || NYS || align=right data-sort-value="0.63" | 630 m || 
|-id=162 bgcolor=#fefefe
| 388162 ||  || — || December 26, 2005 || Kitt Peak || Spacewatch || NYS || align=right data-sort-value="0.56" | 560 m || 
|-id=163 bgcolor=#fefefe
| 388163 ||  || — || December 28, 2005 || Mount Lemmon || Mount Lemmon Survey || — || align=right data-sort-value="0.78" | 780 m || 
|-id=164 bgcolor=#fefefe
| 388164 ||  || — || December 27, 2005 || Mount Lemmon || Mount Lemmon Survey || MAS || align=right data-sort-value="0.74" | 740 m || 
|-id=165 bgcolor=#fefefe
| 388165 ||  || — || December 29, 2005 || Kitt Peak || Spacewatch || MAS || align=right data-sort-value="0.70" | 700 m || 
|-id=166 bgcolor=#fefefe
| 388166 ||  || — || January 6, 2006 || Kitt Peak || Spacewatch || — || align=right data-sort-value="0.98" | 980 m || 
|-id=167 bgcolor=#E9E9E9
| 388167 ||  || — || January 4, 2006 || Kitt Peak || Spacewatch || — || align=right | 1.8 km || 
|-id=168 bgcolor=#fefefe
| 388168 ||  || — || January 5, 2006 || Kitt Peak || Spacewatch || — || align=right data-sort-value="0.84" | 840 m || 
|-id=169 bgcolor=#fefefe
| 388169 ||  || — || January 5, 2006 || Kitt Peak || Spacewatch || fast? || align=right data-sort-value="0.98" | 980 m || 
|-id=170 bgcolor=#fefefe
| 388170 ||  || — || January 4, 2006 || Kitt Peak || Spacewatch || — || align=right data-sort-value="0.92" | 920 m || 
|-id=171 bgcolor=#E9E9E9
| 388171 ||  || — || January 7, 2006 || Mount Lemmon || Mount Lemmon Survey || JUL || align=right | 1.1 km || 
|-id=172 bgcolor=#fefefe
| 388172 ||  || — || January 23, 2006 || Mount Lemmon || Mount Lemmon Survey || MAS || align=right data-sort-value="0.82" | 820 m || 
|-id=173 bgcolor=#fefefe
| 388173 ||  || — || January 28, 2006 || Catalina || CSS || H || align=right data-sort-value="0.71" | 710 m || 
|-id=174 bgcolor=#fefefe
| 388174 ||  || — || January 25, 2006 || Kitt Peak || Spacewatch || — || align=right data-sort-value="0.70" | 700 m || 
|-id=175 bgcolor=#fefefe
| 388175 ||  || — || March 31, 2003 || Kitt Peak || Spacewatch || — || align=right data-sort-value="0.94" | 940 m || 
|-id=176 bgcolor=#E9E9E9
| 388176 ||  || — || January 8, 2006 || Mount Lemmon || Mount Lemmon Survey || — || align=right | 1.1 km || 
|-id=177 bgcolor=#E9E9E9
| 388177 ||  || — || January 26, 2006 || Mount Lemmon || Mount Lemmon Survey || — || align=right | 1.2 km || 
|-id=178 bgcolor=#E9E9E9
| 388178 ||  || — || January 28, 2006 || Mount Lemmon || Mount Lemmon Survey || — || align=right data-sort-value="0.85" | 850 m || 
|-id=179 bgcolor=#fefefe
| 388179 ||  || — || January 31, 2006 || Junk Bond || D. Healy || MAS || align=right data-sort-value="0.87" | 870 m || 
|-id=180 bgcolor=#fefefe
| 388180 ||  || — || January 25, 2006 || Kitt Peak || Spacewatch || — || align=right | 1.2 km || 
|-id=181 bgcolor=#E9E9E9
| 388181 ||  || — || January 26, 2006 || Mount Lemmon || Mount Lemmon Survey || — || align=right data-sort-value="0.73" | 730 m || 
|-id=182 bgcolor=#fefefe
| 388182 ||  || — || January 31, 2006 || Kitt Peak || Spacewatch || MAS || align=right data-sort-value="0.92" | 920 m || 
|-id=183 bgcolor=#fefefe
| 388183 ||  || — || May 25, 2003 || Kitt Peak || Spacewatch || CLA || align=right | 2.6 km || 
|-id=184 bgcolor=#fefefe
| 388184 ||  || — || January 31, 2006 || Siding Spring || SSS || H || align=right data-sort-value="0.94" | 940 m || 
|-id=185 bgcolor=#FFC2E0
| 388185 ||  || — || February 7, 2006 || Socorro || LINEAR || AMO +1km || align=right | 2.8 km || 
|-id=186 bgcolor=#fefefe
| 388186 ||  || — || February 1, 2006 || Mount Lemmon || Mount Lemmon Survey || — || align=right data-sort-value="0.75" | 750 m || 
|-id=187 bgcolor=#E9E9E9
| 388187 ||  || — || February 21, 2006 || Catalina || CSS || — || align=right | 1.9 km || 
|-id=188 bgcolor=#FFC2E0
| 388188 ||  || — || February 23, 2006 || Socorro || LINEAR || APOPHA || align=right data-sort-value="0.59" | 590 m || 
|-id=189 bgcolor=#FFC2E0
| 388189 ||  || — || February 24, 2006 || Catalina || CSS || ATE || align=right data-sort-value="0.32" | 320 m || 
|-id=190 bgcolor=#E9E9E9
| 388190 ||  || — || February 20, 2006 || Kitt Peak || Spacewatch || — || align=right data-sort-value="0.77" | 770 m || 
|-id=191 bgcolor=#E9E9E9
| 388191 ||  || — || January 10, 2006 || Mount Lemmon || Mount Lemmon Survey || — || align=right | 1.9 km || 
|-id=192 bgcolor=#E9E9E9
| 388192 ||  || — || February 20, 2006 || Kitt Peak || Spacewatch || — || align=right | 2.4 km || 
|-id=193 bgcolor=#E9E9E9
| 388193 ||  || — || February 20, 2006 || Kitt Peak || Spacewatch || — || align=right | 1.7 km || 
|-id=194 bgcolor=#E9E9E9
| 388194 ||  || — || February 24, 2006 || Kitt Peak || Spacewatch || — || align=right data-sort-value="0.69" | 690 m || 
|-id=195 bgcolor=#E9E9E9
| 388195 ||  || — || February 24, 2006 || Kitt Peak || Spacewatch || — || align=right data-sort-value="0.94" | 940 m || 
|-id=196 bgcolor=#E9E9E9
| 388196 ||  || — || February 25, 2006 || Mount Lemmon || Mount Lemmon Survey || — || align=right data-sort-value="0.96" | 960 m || 
|-id=197 bgcolor=#E9E9E9
| 388197 ||  || — || January 31, 2006 || Kitt Peak || Spacewatch || — || align=right | 1.8 km || 
|-id=198 bgcolor=#E9E9E9
| 388198 ||  || — || February 25, 2006 || Kitt Peak || Spacewatch || — || align=right | 1.2 km || 
|-id=199 bgcolor=#E9E9E9
| 388199 ||  || — || February 27, 2006 || Kitt Peak || Spacewatch || — || align=right | 1.1 km || 
|-id=200 bgcolor=#E9E9E9
| 388200 ||  || — || April 11, 2002 || Socorro || LINEAR || — || align=right | 1.8 km || 
|}

388201–388300 

|-bgcolor=#E9E9E9
| 388201 ||  || — || February 27, 2006 || Kitt Peak || Spacewatch || EUN || align=right | 1.5 km || 
|-id=202 bgcolor=#E9E9E9
| 388202 ||  || — || February 24, 2006 || Mount Lemmon || Mount Lemmon Survey || MAR || align=right | 1.2 km || 
|-id=203 bgcolor=#E9E9E9
| 388203 ||  || — || February 25, 2006 || Kitt Peak || Spacewatch || — || align=right data-sort-value="0.81" | 810 m || 
|-id=204 bgcolor=#E9E9E9
| 388204 ||  || — || March 3, 2006 || Kitt Peak || Spacewatch || — || align=right data-sort-value="0.99" | 990 m || 
|-id=205 bgcolor=#fefefe
| 388205 ||  || — || March 3, 2006 || Mount Lemmon || Mount Lemmon Survey || H || align=right data-sort-value="0.73" | 730 m || 
|-id=206 bgcolor=#E9E9E9
| 388206 ||  || — || March 2, 2006 || Mount Lemmon || Mount Lemmon Survey || — || align=right data-sort-value="0.87" | 870 m || 
|-id=207 bgcolor=#E9E9E9
| 388207 ||  || — || March 25, 2006 || Mount Lemmon || Mount Lemmon Survey || — || align=right | 1.1 km || 
|-id=208 bgcolor=#E9E9E9
| 388208 ||  || — || March 26, 2006 || Mount Lemmon || Mount Lemmon Survey || — || align=right | 1.9 km || 
|-id=209 bgcolor=#E9E9E9
| 388209 ||  || — || March 24, 2006 || Socorro || LINEAR || — || align=right | 1.4 km || 
|-id=210 bgcolor=#E9E9E9
| 388210 ||  || — || April 2, 2006 || Kitt Peak || Spacewatch || EUN || align=right | 1.1 km || 
|-id=211 bgcolor=#E9E9E9
| 388211 ||  || — || April 7, 2006 || Kitt Peak || Spacewatch || — || align=right | 1.2 km || 
|-id=212 bgcolor=#E9E9E9
| 388212 ||  || — || April 7, 2006 || Kitt Peak || Spacewatch || — || align=right | 1.5 km || 
|-id=213 bgcolor=#E9E9E9
| 388213 ||  || — || April 2, 2006 || Kitt Peak || Spacewatch || MIS || align=right | 1.8 km || 
|-id=214 bgcolor=#E9E9E9
| 388214 ||  || — || April 20, 2006 || Kitt Peak || Spacewatch || — || align=right | 2.3 km || 
|-id=215 bgcolor=#E9E9E9
| 388215 ||  || — || April 19, 2006 || Mount Lemmon || Mount Lemmon Survey || — || align=right | 1.7 km || 
|-id=216 bgcolor=#E9E9E9
| 388216 ||  || — || April 21, 2006 || Kitt Peak || Spacewatch || — || align=right | 2.3 km || 
|-id=217 bgcolor=#E9E9E9
| 388217 ||  || — || April 24, 2006 || Socorro || LINEAR || — || align=right | 2.4 km || 
|-id=218 bgcolor=#E9E9E9
| 388218 ||  || — || April 25, 2006 || Kitt Peak || Spacewatch || HEN || align=right | 1.1 km || 
|-id=219 bgcolor=#E9E9E9
| 388219 ||  || — || April 26, 2006 || Kitt Peak || Spacewatch || — || align=right | 1.1 km || 
|-id=220 bgcolor=#E9E9E9
| 388220 ||  || — || April 29, 2006 || Kitt Peak || Spacewatch || — || align=right | 1.4 km || 
|-id=221 bgcolor=#E9E9E9
| 388221 ||  || — || April 30, 2006 || Kitt Peak || Spacewatch || — || align=right | 1.6 km || 
|-id=222 bgcolor=#E9E9E9
| 388222 ||  || — || April 30, 2006 || Kitt Peak || Spacewatch || — || align=right | 2.3 km || 
|-id=223 bgcolor=#E9E9E9
| 388223 ||  || — || May 3, 2006 || Bergisch Gladbach || W. Bickel || — || align=right | 1.8 km || 
|-id=224 bgcolor=#E9E9E9
| 388224 ||  || — || May 1, 2006 || Kitt Peak || Spacewatch || — || align=right | 1.8 km || 
|-id=225 bgcolor=#E9E9E9
| 388225 ||  || — || May 2, 2006 || Mount Lemmon || Mount Lemmon Survey || — || align=right | 3.1 km || 
|-id=226 bgcolor=#E9E9E9
| 388226 ||  || — || May 5, 2006 || Reedy Creek || J. Broughton || — || align=right | 1.3 km || 
|-id=227 bgcolor=#E9E9E9
| 388227 ||  || — || May 14, 2006 || Palomar || NEAT || KRM || align=right | 3.1 km || 
|-id=228 bgcolor=#E9E9E9
| 388228 ||  || — || May 8, 2006 || Mount Lemmon || Mount Lemmon Survey || — || align=right | 2.8 km || 
|-id=229 bgcolor=#E9E9E9
| 388229 ||  || — || May 1, 2006 || Catalina || CSS || EUN || align=right | 1.5 km || 
|-id=230 bgcolor=#E9E9E9
| 388230 ||  || — || May 20, 2006 || Kitt Peak || Spacewatch || — || align=right | 1.3 km || 
|-id=231 bgcolor=#E9E9E9
| 388231 ||  || — || May 20, 2006 || Palomar || NEAT || — || align=right | 2.7 km || 
|-id=232 bgcolor=#E9E9E9
| 388232 ||  || — || April 24, 2006 || Kitt Peak || Spacewatch || — || align=right | 1.8 km || 
|-id=233 bgcolor=#E9E9E9
| 388233 ||  || — || May 21, 2006 || Kitt Peak || Spacewatch || MAR || align=right | 1.2 km || 
|-id=234 bgcolor=#E9E9E9
| 388234 ||  || — || May 21, 2006 || Kitt Peak || Spacewatch || — || align=right | 2.5 km || 
|-id=235 bgcolor=#E9E9E9
| 388235 ||  || — || May 21, 2006 || Kitt Peak || Spacewatch || — || align=right | 1.7 km || 
|-id=236 bgcolor=#E9E9E9
| 388236 ||  || — || May 21, 2006 || Kitt Peak || Spacewatch || — || align=right | 2.1 km || 
|-id=237 bgcolor=#E9E9E9
| 388237 ||  || — || May 20, 2006 || Catalina || CSS || — || align=right | 2.7 km || 
|-id=238 bgcolor=#E9E9E9
| 388238 ||  || — || May 20, 2006 || Kitt Peak || Spacewatch || — || align=right | 2.6 km || 
|-id=239 bgcolor=#E9E9E9
| 388239 ||  || — || May 20, 2006 || Kitt Peak || Spacewatch || — || align=right | 1.4 km || 
|-id=240 bgcolor=#E9E9E9
| 388240 ||  || — || May 20, 2006 || Kitt Peak || Spacewatch || — || align=right | 2.3 km || 
|-id=241 bgcolor=#d6d6d6
| 388241 ||  || — || May 20, 2006 || Kitt Peak || Spacewatch || — || align=right | 2.6 km || 
|-id=242 bgcolor=#E9E9E9
| 388242 ||  || — || May 21, 2006 || Anderson Mesa || LONEOS || — || align=right | 1.4 km || 
|-id=243 bgcolor=#E9E9E9
| 388243 ||  || — || May 20, 2006 || Kitt Peak || Spacewatch || EUN || align=right | 1.1 km || 
|-id=244 bgcolor=#E9E9E9
| 388244 ||  || — || May 21, 2006 || Kitt Peak || Spacewatch || MAR || align=right | 1.3 km || 
|-id=245 bgcolor=#E9E9E9
| 388245 ||  || — || May 21, 2006 || Kitt Peak || Spacewatch || JUN || align=right | 1.4 km || 
|-id=246 bgcolor=#E9E9E9
| 388246 ||  || — || May 22, 2006 || Kitt Peak || Spacewatch || — || align=right | 3.1 km || 
|-id=247 bgcolor=#E9E9E9
| 388247 ||  || — || November 24, 2003 || Kitt Peak || Spacewatch || PAD || align=right | 1.9 km || 
|-id=248 bgcolor=#E9E9E9
| 388248 ||  || — || May 23, 2006 || Kitt Peak || Spacewatch || — || align=right | 2.6 km || 
|-id=249 bgcolor=#E9E9E9
| 388249 ||  || — || May 24, 2006 || Kitt Peak || Spacewatch || — || align=right | 1.2 km || 
|-id=250 bgcolor=#E9E9E9
| 388250 ||  || — || May 23, 2006 || Kitt Peak || Spacewatch || — || align=right | 2.6 km || 
|-id=251 bgcolor=#E9E9E9
| 388251 ||  || — || May 29, 2006 || Kitt Peak || Spacewatch || ADE || align=right | 2.0 km || 
|-id=252 bgcolor=#E9E9E9
| 388252 ||  || — || June 18, 2006 || Kitt Peak || Spacewatch || — || align=right | 2.2 km || 
|-id=253 bgcolor=#E9E9E9
| 388253 ||  || — || June 18, 2006 || Siding Spring || SSS || — || align=right | 2.0 km || 
|-id=254 bgcolor=#E9E9E9
| 388254 ||  || — || July 21, 2006 || Palomar || NEAT || — || align=right | 1.9 km || 
|-id=255 bgcolor=#E9E9E9
| 388255 ||  || — || July 20, 2006 || Palomar || NEAT || — || align=right | 2.0 km || 
|-id=256 bgcolor=#E9E9E9
| 388256 ||  || — || July 25, 2006 || Mount Lemmon || Mount Lemmon Survey || — || align=right | 2.8 km || 
|-id=257 bgcolor=#E9E9E9
| 388257 ||  || — || August 15, 2006 || Palomar || NEAT || — || align=right | 1.9 km || 
|-id=258 bgcolor=#E9E9E9
| 388258 ||  || — || August 13, 2006 || Palomar || NEAT || — || align=right | 2.2 km || 
|-id=259 bgcolor=#FA8072
| 388259 ||  || — || August 17, 2006 || Palomar || NEAT || — || align=right data-sort-value="0.68" | 680 m || 
|-id=260 bgcolor=#E9E9E9
| 388260 ||  || — || August 18, 2006 || Socorro || LINEAR || — || align=right | 2.6 km || 
|-id=261 bgcolor=#d6d6d6
| 388261 ||  || — || August 17, 2006 || Palomar || NEAT || — || align=right | 3.6 km || 
|-id=262 bgcolor=#d6d6d6
| 388262 ||  || — || August 21, 2006 || Socorro || LINEAR || — || align=right | 4.8 km || 
|-id=263 bgcolor=#d6d6d6
| 388263 ||  || — || August 21, 2006 || Palomar || NEAT || TIR || align=right | 3.3 km || 
|-id=264 bgcolor=#E9E9E9
| 388264 ||  || — || August 19, 2006 || Anderson Mesa || LONEOS || — || align=right | 2.2 km || 
|-id=265 bgcolor=#d6d6d6
| 388265 ||  || — || August 24, 2006 || Socorro || LINEAR || LIX || align=right | 3.8 km || 
|-id=266 bgcolor=#d6d6d6
| 388266 ||  || — || August 16, 2006 || Palomar || NEAT || EUP || align=right | 3.8 km || 
|-id=267 bgcolor=#fefefe
| 388267 ||  || — || August 22, 2006 || Palomar || NEAT || — || align=right data-sort-value="0.55" | 550 m || 
|-id=268 bgcolor=#d6d6d6
| 388268 ||  || — || August 28, 2006 || Catalina || CSS || TIR || align=right | 3.3 km || 
|-id=269 bgcolor=#E9E9E9
| 388269 ||  || — || August 29, 2006 || Catalina || CSS || IAN || align=right data-sort-value="0.84" | 840 m || 
|-id=270 bgcolor=#d6d6d6
| 388270 ||  || — || August 28, 2006 || Kitt Peak || Spacewatch || — || align=right | 2.2 km || 
|-id=271 bgcolor=#d6d6d6
| 388271 ||  || — || September 14, 2006 || Catalina || CSS || THB || align=right | 3.1 km || 
|-id=272 bgcolor=#d6d6d6
| 388272 ||  || — || September 12, 2006 || Catalina || CSS || — || align=right | 2.9 km || 
|-id=273 bgcolor=#d6d6d6
| 388273 ||  || — || September 14, 2006 || Kitt Peak || Spacewatch || — || align=right | 2.6 km || 
|-id=274 bgcolor=#d6d6d6
| 388274 ||  || — || September 15, 2006 || Kitt Peak || Spacewatch || — || align=right | 3.0 km || 
|-id=275 bgcolor=#d6d6d6
| 388275 ||  || — || September 15, 2006 || Kitt Peak || Spacewatch || — || align=right | 2.5 km || 
|-id=276 bgcolor=#d6d6d6
| 388276 ||  || — || September 15, 2006 || Kitt Peak || Spacewatch || — || align=right | 2.8 km || 
|-id=277 bgcolor=#d6d6d6
| 388277 ||  || — || September 15, 2006 || Kitt Peak || Spacewatch || — || align=right | 1.8 km || 
|-id=278 bgcolor=#d6d6d6
| 388278 ||  || — || September 15, 2006 || Kitt Peak || Spacewatch || — || align=right | 3.4 km || 
|-id=279 bgcolor=#d6d6d6
| 388279 ||  || — || September 15, 2006 || Kitt Peak || Spacewatch || ALA || align=right | 2.7 km || 
|-id=280 bgcolor=#d6d6d6
| 388280 ||  || — || September 14, 2006 || Catalina || CSS || — || align=right | 3.2 km || 
|-id=281 bgcolor=#d6d6d6
| 388281 ||  || — || September 11, 2006 || Apache Point || A. C. Becker || — || align=right | 2.6 km || 
|-id=282 bgcolor=#d6d6d6
| 388282 ʻAkepa ||  ||  || September 14, 2006 || Mauna Kea || J. Masiero || — || align=right | 2.3 km || 
|-id=283 bgcolor=#d6d6d6
| 388283 ||  || — || September 15, 2006 || Kitt Peak || Spacewatch || EOS || align=right | 2.3 km || 
|-id=284 bgcolor=#d6d6d6
| 388284 ||  || — || September 17, 2006 || Kitt Peak || Spacewatch || — || align=right | 2.1 km || 
|-id=285 bgcolor=#d6d6d6
| 388285 ||  || — || September 17, 2006 || Anderson Mesa || LONEOS || — || align=right | 3.3 km || 
|-id=286 bgcolor=#d6d6d6
| 388286 ||  || — || September 17, 2006 || Kitt Peak || Spacewatch || — || align=right | 2.4 km || 
|-id=287 bgcolor=#fefefe
| 388287 ||  || — || September 18, 2006 || Catalina || CSS || FLO || align=right data-sort-value="0.66" | 660 m || 
|-id=288 bgcolor=#d6d6d6
| 388288 ||  || — || September 19, 2006 || Kitt Peak || Spacewatch || EOS || align=right | 1.6 km || 
|-id=289 bgcolor=#d6d6d6
| 388289 ||  || — || September 20, 2006 || Calvin-Rehoboth || L. A. Molnar || VER || align=right | 2.6 km || 
|-id=290 bgcolor=#d6d6d6
| 388290 ||  || — || September 17, 2006 || Kitt Peak || Spacewatch || — || align=right | 3.1 km || 
|-id=291 bgcolor=#d6d6d6
| 388291 ||  || — || September 18, 2006 || Kitt Peak || Spacewatch || — || align=right | 2.6 km || 
|-id=292 bgcolor=#d6d6d6
| 388292 ||  || — || September 18, 2006 || Kitt Peak || Spacewatch || — || align=right | 3.0 km || 
|-id=293 bgcolor=#d6d6d6
| 388293 ||  || — || September 18, 2006 || Kitt Peak || Spacewatch || VER || align=right | 2.6 km || 
|-id=294 bgcolor=#d6d6d6
| 388294 ||  || — || September 19, 2006 || Kitt Peak || Spacewatch || KOR || align=right | 1.5 km || 
|-id=295 bgcolor=#d6d6d6
| 388295 ||  || — || September 23, 2006 || Kitt Peak || Spacewatch || — || align=right | 3.0 km || 
|-id=296 bgcolor=#d6d6d6
| 388296 ||  || — || September 16, 2006 || Catalina || CSS || EUP || align=right | 4.2 km || 
|-id=297 bgcolor=#fefefe
| 388297 ||  || — || September 20, 2006 || Catalina || CSS || FLO || align=right data-sort-value="0.61" | 610 m || 
|-id=298 bgcolor=#d6d6d6
| 388298 ||  || — || September 24, 2006 || Anderson Mesa || LONEOS || — || align=right | 3.1 km || 
|-id=299 bgcolor=#d6d6d6
| 388299 ||  || — || September 19, 2006 || Kitt Peak || Spacewatch || — || align=right | 2.6 km || 
|-id=300 bgcolor=#d6d6d6
| 388300 ||  || — || September 19, 2006 || Kitt Peak || Spacewatch || — || align=right | 2.4 km || 
|}

388301–388400 

|-bgcolor=#d6d6d6
| 388301 ||  || — || September 19, 2006 || Kitt Peak || Spacewatch || — || align=right | 2.4 km || 
|-id=302 bgcolor=#d6d6d6
| 388302 ||  || — || September 23, 2006 || Kitt Peak || Spacewatch || — || align=right | 2.3 km || 
|-id=303 bgcolor=#d6d6d6
| 388303 ||  || — || September 25, 2006 || Kitt Peak || Spacewatch || — || align=right | 3.3 km || 
|-id=304 bgcolor=#d6d6d6
| 388304 ||  || — || September 24, 2006 || Kitt Peak || Spacewatch || — || align=right | 2.5 km || 
|-id=305 bgcolor=#d6d6d6
| 388305 ||  || — || September 26, 2006 || Kitt Peak || Spacewatch || EOS || align=right | 2.3 km || 
|-id=306 bgcolor=#fefefe
| 388306 ||  || — || September 26, 2006 || Kitt Peak || Spacewatch || — || align=right data-sort-value="0.66" | 660 m || 
|-id=307 bgcolor=#d6d6d6
| 388307 ||  || — || September 26, 2006 || Mount Lemmon || Mount Lemmon Survey || — || align=right | 2.8 km || 
|-id=308 bgcolor=#d6d6d6
| 388308 ||  || — || September 26, 2006 || Kitt Peak || Spacewatch || KOR || align=right | 1.4 km || 
|-id=309 bgcolor=#d6d6d6
| 388309 ||  || — || September 26, 2006 || Kitt Peak || Spacewatch || HYG || align=right | 2.3 km || 
|-id=310 bgcolor=#d6d6d6
| 388310 ||  || — || September 21, 2006 || Anderson Mesa || LONEOS || — || align=right | 3.4 km || 
|-id=311 bgcolor=#d6d6d6
| 388311 ||  || — || September 25, 2006 || Mount Lemmon || Mount Lemmon Survey || — || align=right | 2.8 km || 
|-id=312 bgcolor=#d6d6d6
| 388312 ||  || — || September 27, 2006 || Kitt Peak || Spacewatch || — || align=right | 3.0 km || 
|-id=313 bgcolor=#d6d6d6
| 388313 ||  || — || September 27, 2006 || Kitt Peak || Spacewatch || EOS || align=right | 2.0 km || 
|-id=314 bgcolor=#d6d6d6
| 388314 ||  || — || September 27, 2006 || Kitt Peak || Spacewatch || — || align=right | 2.4 km || 
|-id=315 bgcolor=#d6d6d6
| 388315 ||  || — || September 17, 2006 || Kitt Peak || Spacewatch || — || align=right | 2.9 km || 
|-id=316 bgcolor=#d6d6d6
| 388316 ||  || — || September 27, 2006 || Kitt Peak || Spacewatch || — || align=right | 2.4 km || 
|-id=317 bgcolor=#fefefe
| 388317 ||  || — || September 28, 2006 || Mount Lemmon || Mount Lemmon Survey || — || align=right data-sort-value="0.71" | 710 m || 
|-id=318 bgcolor=#d6d6d6
| 388318 ||  || — || September 28, 2006 || Mount Lemmon || Mount Lemmon Survey || — || align=right | 2.9 km || 
|-id=319 bgcolor=#d6d6d6
| 388319 ||  || — || September 28, 2006 || Kitt Peak || Spacewatch || TEL || align=right | 1.5 km || 
|-id=320 bgcolor=#d6d6d6
| 388320 ||  || — || September 28, 2006 || Kitt Peak || Spacewatch || — || align=right | 3.1 km || 
|-id=321 bgcolor=#d6d6d6
| 388321 ||  || — || September 28, 2006 || Kitt Peak || Spacewatch || — || align=right | 2.5 km || 
|-id=322 bgcolor=#E9E9E9
| 388322 ||  || — || September 28, 2006 || Kitt Peak || Spacewatch || HOF || align=right | 2.5 km || 
|-id=323 bgcolor=#d6d6d6
| 388323 ||  || — || September 28, 2006 || Kitt Peak || Spacewatch || EOS || align=right | 2.0 km || 
|-id=324 bgcolor=#d6d6d6
| 388324 ||  || — || September 28, 2006 || Kitt Peak || Spacewatch || NAE || align=right | 2.1 km || 
|-id=325 bgcolor=#fefefe
| 388325 ||  || — || September 30, 2006 || Catalina || CSS || NYS || align=right data-sort-value="0.62" | 620 m || 
|-id=326 bgcolor=#d6d6d6
| 388326 ||  || — || September 30, 2006 || Mount Lemmon || Mount Lemmon Survey || — || align=right | 3.3 km || 
|-id=327 bgcolor=#d6d6d6
| 388327 ||  || — || September 30, 2006 || Mount Lemmon || Mount Lemmon Survey || — || align=right | 4.4 km || 
|-id=328 bgcolor=#d6d6d6
| 388328 ||  || — || September 17, 2006 || Apache Point || A. C. Becker || — || align=right | 2.5 km || 
|-id=329 bgcolor=#d6d6d6
| 388329 ||  || — || September 20, 2006 || Apache Point || A. C. Becker || EOS || align=right | 1.8 km || 
|-id=330 bgcolor=#d6d6d6
| 388330 ||  || — || September 28, 2006 || Apache Point || A. C. Becker || — || align=right | 2.6 km || 
|-id=331 bgcolor=#d6d6d6
| 388331 ||  || — || September 29, 2006 || Apache Point || A. C. Becker || EOS || align=right | 1.8 km || 
|-id=332 bgcolor=#d6d6d6
| 388332 ||  || — || September 29, 2006 || Apache Point || A. C. Becker || — || align=right | 3.2 km || 
|-id=333 bgcolor=#d6d6d6
| 388333 ||  || — || September 30, 2006 || Apache Point || A. C. Becker || EOS || align=right | 1.8 km || 
|-id=334 bgcolor=#d6d6d6
| 388334 ||  || — || September 30, 2006 || Apache Point || A. C. Becker || EOS || align=right | 2.1 km || 
|-id=335 bgcolor=#d6d6d6
| 388335 ||  || — || September 26, 2006 || Catalina || CSS || — || align=right | 3.7 km || 
|-id=336 bgcolor=#d6d6d6
| 388336 ||  || — || October 15, 2006 || Piszkéstető || K. Sárneczky, Z. Kuli || — || align=right | 3.0 km || 
|-id=337 bgcolor=#d6d6d6
| 388337 ||  || — || September 25, 2006 || Anderson Mesa || LONEOS || — || align=right | 4.1 km || 
|-id=338 bgcolor=#fefefe
| 388338 ||  || — || October 11, 2006 || Kitt Peak || Spacewatch || — || align=right data-sort-value="0.90" | 900 m || 
|-id=339 bgcolor=#d6d6d6
| 388339 ||  || — || October 11, 2006 || Kitt Peak || Spacewatch || — || align=right | 3.3 km || 
|-id=340 bgcolor=#d6d6d6
| 388340 ||  || — || October 12, 2006 || Kitt Peak || Spacewatch || — || align=right | 2.4 km || 
|-id=341 bgcolor=#d6d6d6
| 388341 ||  || — || October 12, 2006 || Kitt Peak || Spacewatch || EOS || align=right | 2.5 km || 
|-id=342 bgcolor=#d6d6d6
| 388342 ||  || — || September 30, 2006 || Mount Lemmon || Mount Lemmon Survey || — || align=right | 3.9 km || 
|-id=343 bgcolor=#d6d6d6
| 388343 ||  || — || October 13, 2006 || Kitt Peak || Spacewatch || EOS || align=right | 2.1 km || 
|-id=344 bgcolor=#d6d6d6
| 388344 ||  || — || July 21, 2006 || Mount Lemmon || Mount Lemmon Survey || — || align=right | 3.1 km || 
|-id=345 bgcolor=#d6d6d6
| 388345 ||  || — || September 27, 2006 || Mount Lemmon || Mount Lemmon Survey || EOS || align=right | 2.2 km || 
|-id=346 bgcolor=#d6d6d6
| 388346 ||  || — || October 15, 2006 || Kitt Peak || Spacewatch || HYG || align=right | 3.1 km || 
|-id=347 bgcolor=#d6d6d6
| 388347 ||  || — || October 2, 2006 || Mount Lemmon || Mount Lemmon Survey || — || align=right | 3.7 km || 
|-id=348 bgcolor=#d6d6d6
| 388348 ||  || — || October 11, 2006 || Apache Point || A. C. Becker || — || align=right | 2.8 km || 
|-id=349 bgcolor=#d6d6d6
| 388349 ||  || — || October 3, 2006 || Mount Lemmon || Mount Lemmon Survey || — || align=right | 3.2 km || 
|-id=350 bgcolor=#d6d6d6
| 388350 ||  || — || October 12, 2006 || Kitt Peak || Spacewatch || — || align=right | 2.9 km || 
|-id=351 bgcolor=#d6d6d6
| 388351 ||  || — || October 1, 2006 || Apache Point || A. C. Becker || EOS || align=right | 2.0 km || 
|-id=352 bgcolor=#d6d6d6
| 388352 ||  || — || October 1, 2006 || Apache Point || A. C. Becker || — || align=right | 2.7 km || 
|-id=353 bgcolor=#d6d6d6
| 388353 ||  || — || October 2, 2006 || Apache Point || A. C. Becker || — || align=right | 3.0 km || 
|-id=354 bgcolor=#d6d6d6
| 388354 ||  || — || October 3, 2006 || Apache Point || A. C. Becker || 628 || align=right | 2.1 km || 
|-id=355 bgcolor=#d6d6d6
| 388355 ||  || — || October 3, 2006 || Apache Point || A. C. Becker || — || align=right | 2.7 km || 
|-id=356 bgcolor=#d6d6d6
| 388356 ||  || — || October 3, 2006 || Apache Point || A. C. Becker || — || align=right | 3.0 km || 
|-id=357 bgcolor=#d6d6d6
| 388357 ||  || — || October 12, 2006 || Apache Point || A. C. Becker || 7:4 || align=right | 2.9 km || 
|-id=358 bgcolor=#fefefe
| 388358 ||  || — || October 16, 2006 || Kitt Peak || Spacewatch || — || align=right data-sort-value="0.62" | 620 m || 
|-id=359 bgcolor=#d6d6d6
| 388359 ||  || — || October 16, 2006 || Kitt Peak || Spacewatch || — || align=right | 2.5 km || 
|-id=360 bgcolor=#fefefe
| 388360 ||  || — || October 16, 2006 || Kitt Peak || Spacewatch || — || align=right data-sort-value="0.57" | 570 m || 
|-id=361 bgcolor=#d6d6d6
| 388361 ||  || — || October 16, 2006 || Kitt Peak || Spacewatch || — || align=right | 2.9 km || 
|-id=362 bgcolor=#d6d6d6
| 388362 ||  || — || October 16, 2006 || Kitt Peak || Spacewatch || — || align=right | 2.2 km || 
|-id=363 bgcolor=#d6d6d6
| 388363 ||  || — || October 16, 2006 || Kitt Peak || Spacewatch || VER || align=right | 3.7 km || 
|-id=364 bgcolor=#d6d6d6
| 388364 ||  || — || September 27, 2006 || Mount Lemmon || Mount Lemmon Survey || — || align=right | 3.1 km || 
|-id=365 bgcolor=#d6d6d6
| 388365 ||  || — || October 16, 2006 || Kitt Peak || Spacewatch || EOS || align=right | 2.1 km || 
|-id=366 bgcolor=#d6d6d6
| 388366 ||  || — || October 16, 2006 || Kitt Peak || Spacewatch || 3:2 || align=right | 5.7 km || 
|-id=367 bgcolor=#d6d6d6
| 388367 ||  || — || October 17, 2006 || Kitt Peak || Spacewatch || URS || align=right | 3.2 km || 
|-id=368 bgcolor=#d6d6d6
| 388368 ||  || — || October 17, 2006 || Mount Lemmon || Mount Lemmon Survey || — || align=right | 2.5 km || 
|-id=369 bgcolor=#d6d6d6
| 388369 ||  || — || October 19, 2006 || Kitt Peak || Spacewatch || — || align=right | 3.0 km || 
|-id=370 bgcolor=#d6d6d6
| 388370 Paulblu ||  ||  || October 20, 2006 || Nogales || J.-C. Merlin || HYG || align=right | 2.5 km || 
|-id=371 bgcolor=#d6d6d6
| 388371 ||  || — || October 22, 2006 || Mount Lemmon || Mount Lemmon Survey || — || align=right | 3.6 km || 
|-id=372 bgcolor=#d6d6d6
| 388372 ||  || — || October 16, 2006 || Kitt Peak || Spacewatch || — || align=right | 2.7 km || 
|-id=373 bgcolor=#d6d6d6
| 388373 ||  || — || October 17, 2006 || Kitt Peak || Spacewatch || — || align=right | 2.7 km || 
|-id=374 bgcolor=#d6d6d6
| 388374 ||  || — || October 17, 2006 || Kitt Peak || Spacewatch || — || align=right | 2.6 km || 
|-id=375 bgcolor=#d6d6d6
| 388375 ||  || — || October 19, 2006 || Kitt Peak || Spacewatch || EOS || align=right | 1.6 km || 
|-id=376 bgcolor=#d6d6d6
| 388376 ||  || — || October 21, 2006 || Mount Lemmon || Mount Lemmon Survey || — || align=right | 2.6 km || 
|-id=377 bgcolor=#d6d6d6
| 388377 ||  || — || October 21, 2006 || Mount Lemmon || Mount Lemmon Survey || THM || align=right | 2.2 km || 
|-id=378 bgcolor=#d6d6d6
| 388378 ||  || — || October 23, 2006 || Kitt Peak || Spacewatch || — || align=right | 2.5 km || 
|-id=379 bgcolor=#d6d6d6
| 388379 ||  || — || October 23, 2006 || Kitt Peak || Spacewatch || — || align=right | 2.8 km || 
|-id=380 bgcolor=#d6d6d6
| 388380 ||  || — || October 20, 2006 || Palomar || NEAT || EOS || align=right | 1.9 km || 
|-id=381 bgcolor=#d6d6d6
| 388381 ||  || — || October 22, 2006 || Kitt Peak || Spacewatch || THM || align=right | 2.3 km || 
|-id=382 bgcolor=#d6d6d6
| 388382 ||  || — || October 28, 2006 || Mount Lemmon || Mount Lemmon Survey || — || align=right | 2.2 km || 
|-id=383 bgcolor=#d6d6d6
| 388383 ||  || — || October 27, 2006 || Kitt Peak || Spacewatch || — || align=right | 2.9 km || 
|-id=384 bgcolor=#d6d6d6
| 388384 ||  || — || October 27, 2006 || Mount Lemmon || Mount Lemmon Survey || EOS || align=right | 1.7 km || 
|-id=385 bgcolor=#d6d6d6
| 388385 ||  || — || October 27, 2006 || Mount Lemmon || Mount Lemmon Survey || — || align=right | 2.6 km || 
|-id=386 bgcolor=#fefefe
| 388386 ||  || — || October 27, 2006 || Mount Lemmon || Mount Lemmon Survey || MAS || align=right data-sort-value="0.54" | 540 m || 
|-id=387 bgcolor=#d6d6d6
| 388387 ||  || — || October 28, 2006 || Kitt Peak || Spacewatch || — || align=right | 3.0 km || 
|-id=388 bgcolor=#d6d6d6
| 388388 ||  || — || October 22, 2006 || Apache Point || SDSS || EOS || align=right | 1.7 km || 
|-id=389 bgcolor=#d6d6d6
| 388389 ||  || — || October 19, 2006 || Kitt Peak || M. W. Buie || — || align=right | 3.0 km || 
|-id=390 bgcolor=#d6d6d6
| 388390 ||  || — || October 19, 2006 || Kitt Peak || Spacewatch || — || align=right | 3.8 km || 
|-id=391 bgcolor=#d6d6d6
| 388391 ||  || — || October 21, 2006 || Mount Lemmon || Mount Lemmon Survey || — || align=right | 3.4 km || 
|-id=392 bgcolor=#d6d6d6
| 388392 ||  || — || October 21, 2006 || Apache Point || A. C. Becker || — || align=right | 2.3 km || 
|-id=393 bgcolor=#d6d6d6
| 388393 ||  || — || October 17, 2006 || Mount Lemmon || Mount Lemmon Survey || THM || align=right | 2.1 km || 
|-id=394 bgcolor=#fefefe
| 388394 ||  || — || October 30, 2006 || Catalina || CSS || — || align=right data-sort-value="0.82" | 820 m || 
|-id=395 bgcolor=#fefefe
| 388395 ||  || — || November 10, 2006 || Kitt Peak || Spacewatch || — || align=right data-sort-value="0.63" | 630 m || 
|-id=396 bgcolor=#fefefe
| 388396 ||  || — || November 11, 2006 || Kitt Peak || Spacewatch || FLO || align=right data-sort-value="0.65" | 650 m || 
|-id=397 bgcolor=#d6d6d6
| 388397 ||  || — || October 15, 2006 || Kitt Peak || Spacewatch || THM || align=right | 2.4 km || 
|-id=398 bgcolor=#d6d6d6
| 388398 ||  || — || November 11, 2006 || Mount Lemmon || Mount Lemmon Survey || HYG || align=right | 2.5 km || 
|-id=399 bgcolor=#d6d6d6
| 388399 ||  || — || November 9, 2006 || Kitt Peak || Spacewatch || — || align=right | 2.9 km || 
|-id=400 bgcolor=#d6d6d6
| 388400 ||  || — || November 10, 2006 || Kitt Peak || Spacewatch || — || align=right | 4.4 km || 
|}

388401–388500 

|-bgcolor=#d6d6d6
| 388401 ||  || — || October 17, 2006 || Catalina || CSS || HYG || align=right | 3.0 km || 
|-id=402 bgcolor=#d6d6d6
| 388402 ||  || — || November 11, 2006 || Mount Lemmon || Mount Lemmon Survey || — || align=right | 2.3 km || 
|-id=403 bgcolor=#d6d6d6
| 388403 ||  || — || November 14, 2006 || Kitt Peak || Spacewatch || — || align=right | 4.0 km || 
|-id=404 bgcolor=#d6d6d6
| 388404 ||  || — || November 16, 2006 || Kitt Peak || Spacewatch || — || align=right | 5.3 km || 
|-id=405 bgcolor=#d6d6d6
| 388405 ||  || — || November 16, 2006 || Kitt Peak || Spacewatch || HYG || align=right | 3.4 km || 
|-id=406 bgcolor=#d6d6d6
| 388406 ||  || — || November 16, 2006 || Kitt Peak || Spacewatch || — || align=right | 3.0 km || 
|-id=407 bgcolor=#fefefe
| 388407 ||  || — || November 16, 2006 || Kitt Peak || Spacewatch || — || align=right data-sort-value="0.82" | 820 m || 
|-id=408 bgcolor=#d6d6d6
| 388408 ||  || — || November 18, 2006 || Kitt Peak || Spacewatch || — || align=right | 3.1 km || 
|-id=409 bgcolor=#d6d6d6
| 388409 ||  || — || November 19, 2006 || Kitt Peak || Spacewatch || — || align=right | 3.1 km || 
|-id=410 bgcolor=#d6d6d6
| 388410 ||  || — || October 15, 1995 || Kitt Peak || Spacewatch || — || align=right | 2.7 km || 
|-id=411 bgcolor=#d6d6d6
| 388411 ||  || — || October 16, 2006 || Catalina || CSS || VER || align=right | 3.6 km || 
|-id=412 bgcolor=#d6d6d6
| 388412 ||  || — || November 11, 2006 || Kitt Peak || Spacewatch || VER || align=right | 2.8 km || 
|-id=413 bgcolor=#fefefe
| 388413 ||  || — || November 22, 2006 || Kitt Peak || Spacewatch || — || align=right data-sort-value="0.82" | 820 m || 
|-id=414 bgcolor=#fefefe
| 388414 ||  || — || November 23, 2006 || Kitt Peak || Spacewatch || FLO || align=right data-sort-value="0.58" | 580 m || 
|-id=415 bgcolor=#fefefe
| 388415 ||  || — || November 23, 2006 || Kitt Peak || Spacewatch || — || align=right data-sort-value="0.82" | 820 m || 
|-id=416 bgcolor=#d6d6d6
| 388416 ||  || — || November 24, 2006 || Mount Lemmon || Mount Lemmon Survey || EOS || align=right | 1.9 km || 
|-id=417 bgcolor=#fefefe
| 388417 ||  || — || November 18, 2006 || Kitt Peak || Spacewatch || FLO || align=right data-sort-value="0.56" | 560 m || 
|-id=418 bgcolor=#fefefe
| 388418 ||  || — || December 13, 2006 || Mount Lemmon || Mount Lemmon Survey || ERI || align=right | 1.6 km || 
|-id=419 bgcolor=#d6d6d6
| 388419 ||  || — || December 14, 2006 || Kitt Peak || Spacewatch || — || align=right | 4.6 km || 
|-id=420 bgcolor=#fefefe
| 388420 ||  || — || December 14, 2006 || Kitt Peak || Spacewatch || — || align=right data-sort-value="0.71" | 710 m || 
|-id=421 bgcolor=#fefefe
| 388421 ||  || — || December 14, 2006 || Marly || P. Kocher || FLO || align=right data-sort-value="0.61" | 610 m || 
|-id=422 bgcolor=#fefefe
| 388422 ||  || — || December 20, 2006 || Mount Lemmon || Mount Lemmon Survey || NYS || align=right data-sort-value="0.61" | 610 m || 
|-id=423 bgcolor=#fefefe
| 388423 ||  || — || February 18, 2004 || Kitt Peak || Spacewatch || FLO || align=right data-sort-value="0.67" | 670 m || 
|-id=424 bgcolor=#fefefe
| 388424 ||  || — || December 21, 2006 || Kitt Peak || Spacewatch || FLO || align=right data-sort-value="0.67" | 670 m || 
|-id=425 bgcolor=#fefefe
| 388425 ||  || — || December 21, 2006 || Kitt Peak || Spacewatch || NYS || align=right data-sort-value="0.60" | 600 m || 
|-id=426 bgcolor=#fefefe
| 388426 ||  || — || January 8, 2007 || Catalina || CSS || FLO || align=right data-sort-value="0.70" | 700 m || 
|-id=427 bgcolor=#fefefe
| 388427 ||  || — || January 8, 2007 || Mount Lemmon || Mount Lemmon Survey || — || align=right data-sort-value="0.72" | 720 m || 
|-id=428 bgcolor=#fefefe
| 388428 ||  || — || January 17, 2007 || Kitt Peak || Spacewatch || — || align=right data-sort-value="0.90" | 900 m || 
|-id=429 bgcolor=#fefefe
| 388429 ||  || — || January 17, 2007 || Kitt Peak || Spacewatch || — || align=right data-sort-value="0.71" | 710 m || 
|-id=430 bgcolor=#fefefe
| 388430 ||  || — || January 24, 2007 || Mount Lemmon || Mount Lemmon Survey || — || align=right data-sort-value="0.79" | 790 m || 
|-id=431 bgcolor=#fefefe
| 388431 ||  || — || January 24, 2007 || Mount Lemmon || Mount Lemmon Survey || — || align=right data-sort-value="0.65" | 650 m || 
|-id=432 bgcolor=#fefefe
| 388432 ||  || — || January 26, 2007 || Kitt Peak || Spacewatch || — || align=right data-sort-value="0.78" | 780 m || 
|-id=433 bgcolor=#fefefe
| 388433 ||  || — || January 24, 2007 || Socorro || LINEAR || — || align=right data-sort-value="0.78" | 780 m || 
|-id=434 bgcolor=#fefefe
| 388434 ||  || — || January 27, 2007 || Mount Lemmon || Mount Lemmon Survey || — || align=right data-sort-value="0.78" | 780 m || 
|-id=435 bgcolor=#fefefe
| 388435 ||  || — || December 1, 2006 || Mount Lemmon || Mount Lemmon Survey || NYS || align=right data-sort-value="0.72" | 720 m || 
|-id=436 bgcolor=#fefefe
| 388436 ||  || — || January 27, 2007 || Kitt Peak || Spacewatch || — || align=right data-sort-value="0.83" | 830 m || 
|-id=437 bgcolor=#fefefe
| 388437 ||  || — || January 17, 2007 || Kitt Peak || Spacewatch || V || align=right data-sort-value="0.63" | 630 m || 
|-id=438 bgcolor=#fefefe
| 388438 ||  || — || January 17, 2007 || Kitt Peak || Spacewatch || FLO || align=right data-sort-value="0.67" | 670 m || 
|-id=439 bgcolor=#fefefe
| 388439 ||  || — || January 27, 2007 || Kitt Peak || Spacewatch || FLO || align=right data-sort-value="0.48" | 480 m || 
|-id=440 bgcolor=#fefefe
| 388440 ||  || — || February 6, 2007 || Mount Lemmon || Mount Lemmon Survey || — || align=right data-sort-value="0.62" | 620 m || 
|-id=441 bgcolor=#fefefe
| 388441 ||  || — || February 6, 2007 || Palomar || NEAT || FLOfast? || align=right data-sort-value="0.74" | 740 m || 
|-id=442 bgcolor=#fefefe
| 388442 ||  || — || February 8, 2007 || Mount Lemmon || Mount Lemmon Survey || — || align=right data-sort-value="0.99" | 990 m || 
|-id=443 bgcolor=#fefefe
| 388443 ||  || — || February 6, 2007 || Mount Lemmon || Mount Lemmon Survey || — || align=right data-sort-value="0.67" | 670 m || 
|-id=444 bgcolor=#fefefe
| 388444 ||  || — || January 17, 2007 || Kitt Peak || Spacewatch || — || align=right data-sort-value="0.93" | 930 m || 
|-id=445 bgcolor=#fefefe
| 388445 ||  || — || February 8, 2007 || Palomar || NEAT || — || align=right data-sort-value="0.76" | 760 m || 
|-id=446 bgcolor=#fefefe
| 388446 ||  || — || February 10, 2007 || Mount Lemmon || Mount Lemmon Survey || — || align=right data-sort-value="0.66" | 660 m || 
|-id=447 bgcolor=#fefefe
| 388447 ||  || — || February 10, 2007 || Catalina || CSS || — || align=right data-sort-value="0.89" | 890 m || 
|-id=448 bgcolor=#fefefe
| 388448 ||  || — || February 16, 2007 || Catalina || CSS || — || align=right data-sort-value="0.95" | 950 m || 
|-id=449 bgcolor=#fefefe
| 388449 ||  || — || February 16, 2007 || Mount Lemmon || Mount Lemmon Survey || — || align=right data-sort-value="0.87" | 870 m || 
|-id=450 bgcolor=#fefefe
| 388450 ||  || — || January 29, 2007 || Kitt Peak || Spacewatch || — || align=right data-sort-value="0.79" | 790 m || 
|-id=451 bgcolor=#fefefe
| 388451 ||  || — || February 17, 2007 || Kitt Peak || Spacewatch || — || align=right data-sort-value="0.68" | 680 m || 
|-id=452 bgcolor=#fefefe
| 388452 ||  || — || February 17, 2007 || Kitt Peak || Spacewatch || — || align=right data-sort-value="0.67" | 670 m || 
|-id=453 bgcolor=#fefefe
| 388453 ||  || — || February 17, 2007 || Kitt Peak || Spacewatch || NYS || align=right data-sort-value="0.70" | 700 m || 
|-id=454 bgcolor=#fefefe
| 388454 ||  || — || February 17, 2007 || Kitt Peak || Spacewatch || — || align=right data-sort-value="0.89" | 890 m || 
|-id=455 bgcolor=#fefefe
| 388455 ||  || — || February 17, 2007 || Kitt Peak || Spacewatch || — || align=right data-sort-value="0.87" | 870 m || 
|-id=456 bgcolor=#fefefe
| 388456 ||  || — || February 17, 2007 || Kitt Peak || Spacewatch || — || align=right data-sort-value="0.78" | 780 m || 
|-id=457 bgcolor=#fefefe
| 388457 ||  || — || February 17, 2007 || Kitt Peak || Spacewatch || NYS || align=right data-sort-value="0.66" | 660 m || 
|-id=458 bgcolor=#fefefe
| 388458 ||  || — || February 17, 2007 || Kitt Peak || Spacewatch || — || align=right data-sort-value="0.78" | 780 m || 
|-id=459 bgcolor=#fefefe
| 388459 ||  || — || January 30, 2000 || Kitt Peak || Spacewatch || V || align=right data-sort-value="0.81" | 810 m || 
|-id=460 bgcolor=#fefefe
| 388460 ||  || — || February 17, 2007 || Goodricke-Pigott || R. A. Tucker || — || align=right | 1.0 km || 
|-id=461 bgcolor=#fefefe
| 388461 ||  || — || February 21, 2007 || Kitt Peak || Spacewatch || — || align=right | 1.8 km || 
|-id=462 bgcolor=#fefefe
| 388462 ||  || — || February 21, 2007 || Socorro || LINEAR || — || align=right | 1.1 km || 
|-id=463 bgcolor=#fefefe
| 388463 ||  || — || February 21, 2007 || Kitt Peak || Spacewatch || — || align=right data-sort-value="0.76" | 760 m || 
|-id=464 bgcolor=#fefefe
| 388464 ||  || — || February 21, 2007 || Kitt Peak || Spacewatch || — || align=right data-sort-value="0.69" | 690 m || 
|-id=465 bgcolor=#fefefe
| 388465 ||  || — || February 21, 2007 || Kitt Peak || Spacewatch || — || align=right data-sort-value="0.76" | 760 m || 
|-id=466 bgcolor=#fefefe
| 388466 ||  || — || February 21, 2007 || Mount Lemmon || Mount Lemmon Survey || — || align=right data-sort-value="0.88" | 880 m || 
|-id=467 bgcolor=#fefefe
| 388467 ||  || — || February 22, 2007 || Catalina || CSS || — || align=right | 1.9 km || 
|-id=468 bgcolor=#FFC2E0
| 388468 ||  || — || February 24, 2007 || Črni Vrh || S. Matičič || AMO +1km || align=right data-sort-value="0.78" | 780 m || 
|-id=469 bgcolor=#fefefe
| 388469 ||  || — || February 21, 2007 || Mount Lemmon || Mount Lemmon Survey || — || align=right data-sort-value="0.82" | 820 m || 
|-id=470 bgcolor=#fefefe
| 388470 ||  || — || February 21, 2007 || Mount Lemmon || Mount Lemmon Survey || — || align=right data-sort-value="0.85" | 850 m || 
|-id=471 bgcolor=#fefefe
| 388471 ||  || — || February 23, 2007 || Kitt Peak || Spacewatch || FLO || align=right data-sort-value="0.75" | 750 m || 
|-id=472 bgcolor=#fefefe
| 388472 ||  || — || February 25, 2007 || Mount Lemmon || Mount Lemmon Survey || — || align=right data-sort-value="0.97" | 970 m || 
|-id=473 bgcolor=#fefefe
| 388473 ||  || — || February 25, 2007 || Mount Lemmon || Mount Lemmon Survey || V || align=right data-sort-value="0.60" | 600 m || 
|-id=474 bgcolor=#fefefe
| 388474 ||  || — || February 26, 2007 || Mount Lemmon || Mount Lemmon Survey || — || align=right data-sort-value="0.62" | 620 m || 
|-id=475 bgcolor=#fefefe
| 388475 ||  || — || March 6, 2007 || Palomar || NEAT || PHO || align=right | 1.1 km || 
|-id=476 bgcolor=#fefefe
| 388476 ||  || — || March 9, 2007 || Mount Lemmon || Mount Lemmon Survey || — || align=right data-sort-value="0.65" | 650 m || 
|-id=477 bgcolor=#fefefe
| 388477 ||  || — || March 9, 2007 || Palomar || NEAT || — || align=right data-sort-value="0.83" | 830 m || 
|-id=478 bgcolor=#fefefe
| 388478 ||  || — || March 9, 2007 || Palomar || NEAT || ERI || align=right | 1.5 km || 
|-id=479 bgcolor=#fefefe
| 388479 ||  || — || March 9, 2007 || Kitt Peak || Spacewatch || — || align=right data-sort-value="0.89" | 890 m || 
|-id=480 bgcolor=#fefefe
| 388480 ||  || — || February 6, 2007 || Kitt Peak || Spacewatch || V || align=right data-sort-value="0.68" | 680 m || 
|-id=481 bgcolor=#fefefe
| 388481 ||  || — || March 9, 2007 || Kitt Peak || Spacewatch || NYS || align=right data-sort-value="0.54" | 540 m || 
|-id=482 bgcolor=#fefefe
| 388482 ||  || — || March 9, 2007 || Kitt Peak || Spacewatch || — || align=right data-sort-value="0.89" | 890 m || 
|-id=483 bgcolor=#fefefe
| 388483 ||  || — || March 9, 2007 || Mount Lemmon || Mount Lemmon Survey || — || align=right | 1.6 km || 
|-id=484 bgcolor=#fefefe
| 388484 ||  || — || March 9, 2007 || Kitt Peak || Spacewatch || — || align=right data-sort-value="0.90" | 900 m || 
|-id=485 bgcolor=#fefefe
| 388485 ||  || — || March 10, 2007 || Kitt Peak || Spacewatch || — || align=right data-sort-value="0.79" | 790 m || 
|-id=486 bgcolor=#fefefe
| 388486 ||  || — || March 10, 2007 || Kitt Peak || Spacewatch || — || align=right data-sort-value="0.81" | 810 m || 
|-id=487 bgcolor=#fefefe
| 388487 ||  || — || March 10, 2007 || Kitt Peak || Spacewatch || — || align=right data-sort-value="0.76" | 760 m || 
|-id=488 bgcolor=#fefefe
| 388488 ||  || — || March 10, 2007 || Kitt Peak || Spacewatch || — || align=right data-sort-value="0.89" | 890 m || 
|-id=489 bgcolor=#fefefe
| 388489 ||  || — || March 10, 2007 || Kitt Peak || Spacewatch || FLO || align=right data-sort-value="0.74" | 740 m || 
|-id=490 bgcolor=#fefefe
| 388490 ||  || — || March 10, 2007 || Kitt Peak || Spacewatch || — || align=right | 1.1 km || 
|-id=491 bgcolor=#fefefe
| 388491 ||  || — || March 10, 2007 || Palomar || NEAT || — || align=right data-sort-value="0.95" | 950 m || 
|-id=492 bgcolor=#fefefe
| 388492 ||  || — || March 10, 2007 || Mount Lemmon || Mount Lemmon Survey || MAS || align=right data-sort-value="0.77" | 770 m || 
|-id=493 bgcolor=#fefefe
| 388493 ||  || — || March 9, 2007 || Mount Lemmon || Mount Lemmon Survey || — || align=right data-sort-value="0.65" | 650 m || 
|-id=494 bgcolor=#fefefe
| 388494 ||  || — || October 20, 2001 || Socorro || LINEAR || NYS || align=right data-sort-value="0.63" | 630 m || 
|-id=495 bgcolor=#fefefe
| 388495 ||  || — || March 10, 2007 || Mount Lemmon || Mount Lemmon Survey || MAS || align=right data-sort-value="0.66" | 660 m || 
|-id=496 bgcolor=#fefefe
| 388496 ||  || — || March 11, 2007 || Kitt Peak || Spacewatch || — || align=right data-sort-value="0.93" | 930 m || 
|-id=497 bgcolor=#fefefe
| 388497 ||  || — || March 11, 2007 || Mount Lemmon || Mount Lemmon Survey || — || align=right data-sort-value="0.69" | 690 m || 
|-id=498 bgcolor=#fefefe
| 388498 ||  || — || March 11, 2007 || Kitt Peak || Spacewatch || — || align=right data-sort-value="0.85" | 850 m || 
|-id=499 bgcolor=#fefefe
| 388499 ||  || — || March 11, 2007 || Kitt Peak || Spacewatch || — || align=right data-sort-value="0.58" | 580 m || 
|-id=500 bgcolor=#fefefe
| 388500 ||  || — || March 11, 2007 || Kitt Peak || Spacewatch || — || align=right data-sort-value="0.90" | 900 m || 
|}

388501–388600 

|-bgcolor=#fefefe
| 388501 ||  || — || March 12, 2007 || Kitt Peak || Spacewatch || — || align=right data-sort-value="0.98" | 980 m || 
|-id=502 bgcolor=#fefefe
| 388502 ||  || — || March 9, 2007 || Mount Lemmon || Mount Lemmon Survey || FLO || align=right data-sort-value="0.56" | 560 m || 
|-id=503 bgcolor=#fefefe
| 388503 ||  || — || March 10, 2007 || Mount Lemmon || Mount Lemmon Survey || — || align=right data-sort-value="0.90" | 900 m || 
|-id=504 bgcolor=#fefefe
| 388504 ||  || — || March 10, 2007 || Palomar || NEAT || — || align=right data-sort-value="0.87" | 870 m || 
|-id=505 bgcolor=#fefefe
| 388505 ||  || — || March 12, 2007 || Mount Lemmon || Mount Lemmon Survey || — || align=right data-sort-value="0.88" | 880 m || 
|-id=506 bgcolor=#fefefe
| 388506 ||  || — || March 12, 2007 || Kitt Peak || Spacewatch || — || align=right data-sort-value="0.94" | 940 m || 
|-id=507 bgcolor=#fefefe
| 388507 ||  || — || March 14, 2007 || Mount Lemmon || Mount Lemmon Survey || NYS || align=right data-sort-value="0.73" | 730 m || 
|-id=508 bgcolor=#FA8072
| 388508 ||  || — || March 12, 2007 || Kitt Peak || Spacewatch || PHO || align=right data-sort-value="0.90" | 900 m || 
|-id=509 bgcolor=#fefefe
| 388509 ||  || — || March 14, 2007 || Kitt Peak || Spacewatch || — || align=right data-sort-value="0.97" | 970 m || 
|-id=510 bgcolor=#fefefe
| 388510 ||  || — || March 13, 2007 || Mount Lemmon || Mount Lemmon Survey || FLO || align=right data-sort-value="0.57" | 570 m || 
|-id=511 bgcolor=#fefefe
| 388511 ||  || — || March 15, 2007 || Mount Lemmon || Mount Lemmon Survey || LCI || align=right | 1.1 km || 
|-id=512 bgcolor=#fefefe
| 388512 ||  || — || March 13, 2007 || Mount Lemmon || Mount Lemmon Survey || V || align=right data-sort-value="0.63" | 630 m || 
|-id=513 bgcolor=#fefefe
| 388513 ||  || — || March 13, 2007 || Kitt Peak || Spacewatch || NYS || align=right data-sort-value="0.51" | 510 m || 
|-id=514 bgcolor=#fefefe
| 388514 ||  || — || March 11, 2007 || Mount Lemmon || Mount Lemmon Survey || — || align=right data-sort-value="0.75" | 750 m || 
|-id=515 bgcolor=#fefefe
| 388515 ||  || — || March 17, 2007 || Socorro || LINEAR || — || align=right data-sort-value="0.88" | 880 m || 
|-id=516 bgcolor=#fefefe
| 388516 ||  || — || March 20, 2007 || Mount Lemmon || Mount Lemmon Survey || MAS || align=right data-sort-value="0.69" | 690 m || 
|-id=517 bgcolor=#fefefe
| 388517 ||  || — || April 11, 2007 || Socorro || LINEAR || PHO || align=right | 1.2 km || 
|-id=518 bgcolor=#fefefe
| 388518 ||  || — || April 11, 2007 || Mount Lemmon || Mount Lemmon Survey || V || align=right data-sort-value="0.68" | 680 m || 
|-id=519 bgcolor=#fefefe
| 388519 ||  || — || April 14, 2007 || Mount Lemmon || Mount Lemmon Survey || NYS || align=right data-sort-value="0.65" | 650 m || 
|-id=520 bgcolor=#fefefe
| 388520 ||  || — || February 23, 2007 || Mount Lemmon || Mount Lemmon Survey || MAS || align=right data-sort-value="0.68" | 680 m || 
|-id=521 bgcolor=#fefefe
| 388521 ||  || — || March 11, 2007 || Kitt Peak || Spacewatch || NYS || align=right data-sort-value="0.60" | 600 m || 
|-id=522 bgcolor=#fefefe
| 388522 ||  || — || April 14, 2007 || Kitt Peak || Spacewatch || MAS || align=right data-sort-value="0.78" | 780 m || 
|-id=523 bgcolor=#fefefe
| 388523 ||  || — || April 14, 2007 || Kitt Peak || Spacewatch || — || align=right data-sort-value="0.74" | 740 m || 
|-id=524 bgcolor=#fefefe
| 388524 ||  || — || April 14, 2007 || Kitt Peak || Spacewatch || NYS || align=right data-sort-value="0.65" | 650 m || 
|-id=525 bgcolor=#fefefe
| 388525 ||  || — || April 14, 2007 || Kitt Peak || Spacewatch || NYS || align=right data-sort-value="0.76" | 760 m || 
|-id=526 bgcolor=#fefefe
| 388526 ||  || — || April 14, 2007 || Kitt Peak || Spacewatch || MAS || align=right data-sort-value="0.61" | 610 m || 
|-id=527 bgcolor=#fefefe
| 388527 ||  || — || April 14, 2007 || Kitt Peak || Spacewatch || — || align=right data-sort-value="0.87" | 870 m || 
|-id=528 bgcolor=#fefefe
| 388528 ||  || — || April 15, 2007 || Mount Lemmon || Mount Lemmon Survey || — || align=right | 1.3 km || 
|-id=529 bgcolor=#fefefe
| 388529 ||  || — || April 15, 2007 || Kitt Peak || Spacewatch || V || align=right data-sort-value="0.88" | 880 m || 
|-id=530 bgcolor=#fefefe
| 388530 ||  || — || April 15, 2007 || Kitt Peak || Spacewatch || NYS || align=right data-sort-value="0.66" | 660 m || 
|-id=531 bgcolor=#fefefe
| 388531 ||  || — || April 16, 2007 || Mount Lemmon || Mount Lemmon Survey || — || align=right data-sort-value="0.87" | 870 m || 
|-id=532 bgcolor=#fefefe
| 388532 ||  || — || April 16, 2007 || Catalina || CSS || FLO || align=right data-sort-value="0.82" | 820 m || 
|-id=533 bgcolor=#fefefe
| 388533 ||  || — || April 16, 2007 || Anderson Mesa || LONEOS || — || align=right | 1.0 km || 
|-id=534 bgcolor=#fefefe
| 388534 ||  || — || April 18, 2007 || Kitt Peak || Spacewatch || NYS || align=right data-sort-value="0.58" | 580 m || 
|-id=535 bgcolor=#d6d6d6
| 388535 ||  || — || April 19, 2007 || Kitt Peak || Spacewatch || 3:2 || align=right | 4.5 km || 
|-id=536 bgcolor=#fefefe
| 388536 ||  || — || April 22, 2007 || Mount Lemmon || Mount Lemmon Survey || NYS || align=right data-sort-value="0.71" | 710 m || 
|-id=537 bgcolor=#fefefe
| 388537 ||  || — || April 20, 2007 || Kitt Peak || Spacewatch || NYS || align=right data-sort-value="0.66" | 660 m || 
|-id=538 bgcolor=#fefefe
| 388538 ||  || — || April 23, 2007 || Catalina || CSS || — || align=right | 1.0 km || 
|-id=539 bgcolor=#fefefe
| 388539 ||  || — || April 22, 2007 || Mount Lemmon || Mount Lemmon Survey || NYS || align=right data-sort-value="0.73" | 730 m || 
|-id=540 bgcolor=#fefefe
| 388540 ||  || — || April 25, 2007 || Mount Lemmon || Mount Lemmon Survey || MAS || align=right data-sort-value="0.65" | 650 m || 
|-id=541 bgcolor=#fefefe
| 388541 ||  || — || April 22, 2007 || Kitt Peak || Spacewatch || — || align=right data-sort-value="0.69" | 690 m || 
|-id=542 bgcolor=#fefefe
| 388542 ||  || — || April 24, 2007 || Kitt Peak || Spacewatch || NYS || align=right data-sort-value="0.57" | 570 m || 
|-id=543 bgcolor=#fefefe
| 388543 ||  || — || April 19, 2007 || Mount Lemmon || Mount Lemmon Survey || — || align=right | 1.1 km || 
|-id=544 bgcolor=#fefefe
| 388544 ||  || — || May 7, 2007 || Kitt Peak || Spacewatch || — || align=right data-sort-value="0.99" | 990 m || 
|-id=545 bgcolor=#fefefe
| 388545 ||  || — || May 9, 2007 || Lulin || LUSS || — || align=right data-sort-value="0.90" | 900 m || 
|-id=546 bgcolor=#fefefe
| 388546 ||  || — || May 8, 2007 || Anderson Mesa || LONEOS || — || align=right | 1.1 km || 
|-id=547 bgcolor=#fefefe
| 388547 ||  || — || May 12, 2007 || Mount Lemmon || Mount Lemmon Survey || MAS || align=right data-sort-value="0.93" | 930 m || 
|-id=548 bgcolor=#fefefe
| 388548 ||  || — || May 12, 2007 || Mount Lemmon || Mount Lemmon Survey || — || align=right data-sort-value="0.92" | 920 m || 
|-id=549 bgcolor=#fefefe
| 388549 ||  || — || June 8, 2007 || Catalina || CSS || NYS || align=right data-sort-value="0.70" | 700 m || 
|-id=550 bgcolor=#fefefe
| 388550 ||  || — || October 8, 2004 || Kitt Peak || Spacewatch || NYS || align=right data-sort-value="0.67" | 670 m || 
|-id=551 bgcolor=#fefefe
| 388551 ||  || — || June 16, 2007 || Kitt Peak || Spacewatch || V || align=right data-sort-value="0.75" | 750 m || 
|-id=552 bgcolor=#fefefe
| 388552 ||  || — || June 19, 2007 || Kitt Peak || Spacewatch || — || align=right | 1.0 km || 
|-id=553 bgcolor=#fefefe
| 388553 ||  || — || June 23, 2007 || Kitt Peak || Spacewatch || H || align=right data-sort-value="0.57" | 570 m || 
|-id=554 bgcolor=#E9E9E9
| 388554 ||  || — || July 11, 2007 || La Sagra || OAM Obs. || — || align=right | 1.2 km || 
|-id=555 bgcolor=#E9E9E9
| 388555 ||  || — || July 10, 2007 || Siding Spring || SSS || — || align=right | 1.7 km || 
|-id=556 bgcolor=#E9E9E9
| 388556 ||  || — || July 19, 2007 || Tiki || S. F. Hönig, N. Teamo || — || align=right | 2.1 km || 
|-id=557 bgcolor=#E9E9E9
| 388557 ||  || — || August 10, 2007 || Kitt Peak || Spacewatch || — || align=right | 3.4 km || 
|-id=558 bgcolor=#d6d6d6
| 388558 ||  || — || July 18, 2007 || Mount Lemmon || Mount Lemmon Survey || — || align=right | 2.7 km || 
|-id=559 bgcolor=#E9E9E9
| 388559 ||  || — || August 8, 2007 || Socorro || LINEAR || MAR || align=right | 1.2 km || 
|-id=560 bgcolor=#d6d6d6
| 388560 ||  || — || September 19, 1973 || Palomar || PLS || — || align=right | 6.4 km || 
|-id=561 bgcolor=#fefefe
| 388561 ||  || — || August 13, 2007 || Socorro || LINEAR || — || align=right | 1.4 km || 
|-id=562 bgcolor=#E9E9E9
| 388562 ||  || — || August 11, 2007 || Anderson Mesa || LONEOS || — || align=right | 2.1 km || 
|-id=563 bgcolor=#E9E9E9
| 388563 ||  || — || August 9, 2007 || Socorro || LINEAR || EUN || align=right | 1.7 km || 
|-id=564 bgcolor=#E9E9E9
| 388564 ||  || — || August 31, 2007 || Siding Spring || K. Sárneczky, L. Kiss || — || align=right data-sort-value="0.90" | 900 m || 
|-id=565 bgcolor=#E9E9E9
| 388565 ||  || — || August 21, 2007 || Anderson Mesa || LONEOS || — || align=right | 1.7 km || 
|-id=566 bgcolor=#E9E9E9
| 388566 ||  || — || August 10, 2007 || Kitt Peak || Spacewatch || — || align=right | 2.2 km || 
|-id=567 bgcolor=#FFC2E0
| 388567 ||  || — || August 24, 2007 || Purple Mountain || PMO NEO || AMO +1km || align=right data-sort-value="0.86" | 860 m || 
|-id=568 bgcolor=#E9E9E9
| 388568 ||  || — || August 16, 2007 || Purple Mountain || PMO NEO || RAF || align=right | 1.2 km || 
|-id=569 bgcolor=#E9E9E9
| 388569 ||  || — || August 22, 2007 || Anderson Mesa || LONEOS || — || align=right | 2.6 km || 
|-id=570 bgcolor=#E9E9E9
| 388570 ||  || — || September 2, 2007 || Mount Lemmon || Mount Lemmon Survey || — || align=right | 2.0 km || 
|-id=571 bgcolor=#E9E9E9
| 388571 ||  || — || September 5, 2007 || Catalina || CSS || ADE || align=right | 2.5 km || 
|-id=572 bgcolor=#E9E9E9
| 388572 ||  || — || September 5, 2007 || Mount Lemmon || Mount Lemmon Survey || — || align=right | 2.9 km || 
|-id=573 bgcolor=#E9E9E9
| 388573 ||  || — || September 8, 2007 || Anderson Mesa || LONEOS || ADE || align=right | 2.8 km || 
|-id=574 bgcolor=#E9E9E9
| 388574 ||  || — || September 9, 2007 || Kitt Peak || Spacewatch || — || align=right | 1.3 km || 
|-id=575 bgcolor=#E9E9E9
| 388575 ||  || — || September 9, 2007 || Kitt Peak || Spacewatch || — || align=right | 2.5 km || 
|-id=576 bgcolor=#E9E9E9
| 388576 ||  || — || September 10, 2007 || Kitt Peak || Spacewatch || — || align=right | 2.4 km || 
|-id=577 bgcolor=#E9E9E9
| 388577 ||  || — || September 10, 2007 || Kitt Peak || Spacewatch || — || align=right | 1.9 km || 
|-id=578 bgcolor=#E9E9E9
| 388578 ||  || — || August 10, 2007 || Kitt Peak || Spacewatch || GEF || align=right | 1.4 km || 
|-id=579 bgcolor=#E9E9E9
| 388579 ||  || — || September 10, 2007 || Mount Lemmon || Mount Lemmon Survey || — || align=right | 1.6 km || 
|-id=580 bgcolor=#E9E9E9
| 388580 ||  || — || September 10, 2007 || Mount Lemmon || Mount Lemmon Survey || — || align=right | 2.4 km || 
|-id=581 bgcolor=#E9E9E9
| 388581 ||  || — || September 10, 2007 || Mount Lemmon || Mount Lemmon Survey || — || align=right | 1.6 km || 
|-id=582 bgcolor=#E9E9E9
| 388582 ||  || — || September 10, 2007 || Mount Lemmon || Mount Lemmon Survey || — || align=right | 1.6 km || 
|-id=583 bgcolor=#d6d6d6
| 388583 ||  || — || September 10, 2007 || Mount Lemmon || Mount Lemmon Survey || — || align=right | 3.9 km || 
|-id=584 bgcolor=#fefefe
| 388584 ||  || — || September 11, 2007 || Catalina || CSS || H || align=right data-sort-value="0.56" | 560 m || 
|-id=585 bgcolor=#E9E9E9
| 388585 ||  || — || August 24, 2007 || Kitt Peak || Spacewatch || — || align=right | 1.9 km || 
|-id=586 bgcolor=#E9E9E9
| 388586 ||  || — || September 11, 2007 || Kitt Peak || Spacewatch || AGN || align=right | 1.1 km || 
|-id=587 bgcolor=#E9E9E9
| 388587 ||  || — || September 12, 2007 || Mount Lemmon || Mount Lemmon Survey || NEM || align=right | 2.1 km || 
|-id=588 bgcolor=#fefefe
| 388588 ||  || — || September 12, 2007 || Catalina || CSS || H || align=right data-sort-value="0.81" | 810 m || 
|-id=589 bgcolor=#E9E9E9
| 388589 ||  || — || September 28, 2003 || Kitt Peak || Spacewatch || — || align=right data-sort-value="0.98" | 980 m || 
|-id=590 bgcolor=#fefefe
| 388590 ||  || — || September 12, 2007 || Anderson Mesa || LONEOS || H || align=right data-sort-value="0.68" | 680 m || 
|-id=591 bgcolor=#E9E9E9
| 388591 ||  || — || September 11, 2007 || Mount Lemmon || Mount Lemmon Survey || — || align=right | 2.1 km || 
|-id=592 bgcolor=#E9E9E9
| 388592 ||  || — || September 14, 2007 || Socorro || LINEAR || — || align=right | 2.2 km || 
|-id=593 bgcolor=#fefefe
| 388593 ||  || — || September 14, 2007 || Socorro || LINEAR || H || align=right data-sort-value="0.61" | 610 m || 
|-id=594 bgcolor=#E9E9E9
| 388594 ||  || — || September 10, 2007 || Kitt Peak || Spacewatch || — || align=right | 3.2 km || 
|-id=595 bgcolor=#E9E9E9
| 388595 ||  || — || August 24, 2007 || Kitt Peak || Spacewatch || — || align=right | 1.9 km || 
|-id=596 bgcolor=#E9E9E9
| 388596 ||  || — || September 10, 2007 || Kitt Peak || Spacewatch || — || align=right | 1.4 km || 
|-id=597 bgcolor=#d6d6d6
| 388597 ||  || — || September 10, 2007 || Mount Lemmon || Mount Lemmon Survey || EOS || align=right | 2.0 km || 
|-id=598 bgcolor=#E9E9E9
| 388598 ||  || — || September 11, 2007 || Mount Lemmon || Mount Lemmon Survey || — || align=right | 2.7 km || 
|-id=599 bgcolor=#E9E9E9
| 388599 ||  || — || September 12, 2007 || Mount Lemmon || Mount Lemmon Survey || BRU || align=right | 3.5 km || 
|-id=600 bgcolor=#E9E9E9
| 388600 ||  || — || September 13, 2007 || Mount Lemmon || Mount Lemmon Survey || — || align=right | 1.8 km || 
|}

388601–388700 

|-bgcolor=#E9E9E9
| 388601 ||  || — || September 11, 2007 || Kitt Peak || Spacewatch || — || align=right | 1.6 km || 
|-id=602 bgcolor=#E9E9E9
| 388602 ||  || — || September 13, 2007 || Kitt Peak || Spacewatch || — || align=right | 1.2 km || 
|-id=603 bgcolor=#E9E9E9
| 388603 ||  || — || September 11, 2007 || Mount Lemmon || Mount Lemmon Survey || MAR || align=right data-sort-value="0.95" | 950 m || 
|-id=604 bgcolor=#E9E9E9
| 388604 ||  || — || September 15, 2007 || Socorro || LINEAR || — || align=right | 2.1 km || 
|-id=605 bgcolor=#d6d6d6
| 388605 ||  || — || August 10, 2007 || Kitt Peak || Spacewatch || LIX || align=right | 3.8 km || 
|-id=606 bgcolor=#E9E9E9
| 388606 ||  || — || September 15, 2007 || Kitt Peak || Spacewatch || — || align=right | 2.3 km || 
|-id=607 bgcolor=#E9E9E9
| 388607 ||  || — || September 9, 2007 || Mount Lemmon || Mount Lemmon Survey || — || align=right | 2.3 km || 
|-id=608 bgcolor=#E9E9E9
| 388608 ||  || — || September 8, 2007 || Mount Lemmon || Mount Lemmon Survey || — || align=right | 1.7 km || 
|-id=609 bgcolor=#E9E9E9
| 388609 ||  || — || September 14, 2007 || Mount Lemmon || Mount Lemmon Survey || — || align=right | 2.1 km || 
|-id=610 bgcolor=#E9E9E9
| 388610 ||  || — || November 24, 2003 || Kitt Peak || Spacewatch || NEM || align=right | 2.7 km || 
|-id=611 bgcolor=#E9E9E9
| 388611 ||  || — || September 15, 2007 || Mount Lemmon || Mount Lemmon Survey || MRX || align=right | 1.1 km || 
|-id=612 bgcolor=#E9E9E9
| 388612 ||  || — || September 12, 2007 || Mount Lemmon || Mount Lemmon Survey || critical || align=right | 1.2 km || 
|-id=613 bgcolor=#E9E9E9
| 388613 ||  || — || September 4, 2007 || Mount Lemmon || Mount Lemmon Survey || MAR || align=right | 1.4 km || 
|-id=614 bgcolor=#fefefe
| 388614 ||  || — || September 18, 2007 || Socorro || LINEAR || H || align=right data-sort-value="0.99" | 990 m || 
|-id=615 bgcolor=#E9E9E9
| 388615 ||  || — || September 19, 2007 || Socorro || LINEAR || — || align=right | 2.6 km || 
|-id=616 bgcolor=#E9E9E9
| 388616 ||  || — || September 21, 2007 || Kitt Peak || Spacewatch || — || align=right | 2.3 km || 
|-id=617 bgcolor=#d6d6d6
| 388617 ||  || — || October 7, 2007 || Pla D'Arguines || R. Ferrando || — || align=right | 2.3 km || 
|-id=618 bgcolor=#fefefe
| 388618 ||  || — || October 8, 2007 || La Sagra || OAM Obs. || H || align=right data-sort-value="0.82" | 820 m || 
|-id=619 bgcolor=#E9E9E9
| 388619 ||  || — || October 8, 2007 || Cordell-Lorenz || Cordell–Lorenz Obs. || — || align=right | 1.8 km || 
|-id=620 bgcolor=#E9E9E9
| 388620 ||  || — || October 9, 2007 || Mount Lemmon || Mount Lemmon Survey || — || align=right | 2.9 km || 
|-id=621 bgcolor=#E9E9E9
| 388621 ||  || — || October 4, 2007 || Kitt Peak || Spacewatch || — || align=right | 2.2 km || 
|-id=622 bgcolor=#E9E9E9
| 388622 ||  || — || October 4, 2007 || Catalina || CSS || — || align=right | 2.3 km || 
|-id=623 bgcolor=#E9E9E9
| 388623 ||  || — || October 7, 2007 || Mount Lemmon || Mount Lemmon Survey || — || align=right | 2.7 km || 
|-id=624 bgcolor=#E9E9E9
| 388624 ||  || — || October 4, 2007 || Kitt Peak || Spacewatch || — || align=right | 3.0 km || 
|-id=625 bgcolor=#E9E9E9
| 388625 ||  || — || October 4, 2007 || Kitt Peak || Spacewatch || — || align=right | 2.2 km || 
|-id=626 bgcolor=#E9E9E9
| 388626 ||  || — || October 5, 2007 || Kitt Peak || Spacewatch || — || align=right | 2.8 km || 
|-id=627 bgcolor=#fefefe
| 388627 ||  || — || October 4, 2007 || Kitt Peak || Spacewatch || — || align=right data-sort-value="0.89" | 890 m || 
|-id=628 bgcolor=#d6d6d6
| 388628 ||  || — || October 12, 2007 || Dauban || Chante-Perdrix Obs. || EOS || align=right | 1.8 km || 
|-id=629 bgcolor=#d6d6d6
| 388629 ||  || — || October 14, 2007 || Altschwendt || W. Ries || K-2 || align=right | 1.3 km || 
|-id=630 bgcolor=#E9E9E9
| 388630 ||  || — || October 14, 2007 || Altschwendt || W. Ries || AST || align=right | 1.7 km || 
|-id=631 bgcolor=#d6d6d6
| 388631 ||  || — || October 8, 2007 || Mount Lemmon || Mount Lemmon Survey || — || align=right | 2.2 km || 
|-id=632 bgcolor=#E9E9E9
| 388632 ||  || — || October 8, 2007 || Mount Lemmon || Mount Lemmon Survey || — || align=right | 2.3 km || 
|-id=633 bgcolor=#E9E9E9
| 388633 ||  || — || October 8, 2007 || Mount Lemmon || Mount Lemmon Survey || HOF || align=right | 2.8 km || 
|-id=634 bgcolor=#d6d6d6
| 388634 ||  || — || September 15, 2007 || Mount Lemmon || Mount Lemmon Survey || — || align=right | 2.8 km || 
|-id=635 bgcolor=#d6d6d6
| 388635 ||  || — || October 8, 2007 || Anderson Mesa || LONEOS || Tj (2.99) || align=right | 3.7 km || 
|-id=636 bgcolor=#E9E9E9
| 388636 ||  || — || September 14, 2007 || Mount Lemmon || Mount Lemmon Survey || — || align=right | 2.0 km || 
|-id=637 bgcolor=#d6d6d6
| 388637 ||  || — || September 15, 2007 || Mount Lemmon || Mount Lemmon Survey || — || align=right | 2.0 km || 
|-id=638 bgcolor=#d6d6d6
| 388638 ||  || — || October 7, 2007 || Mount Lemmon || Mount Lemmon Survey || EOS || align=right | 1.9 km || 
|-id=639 bgcolor=#E9E9E9
| 388639 ||  || — || October 9, 2007 || Mount Lemmon || Mount Lemmon Survey || WIT || align=right | 1.5 km || 
|-id=640 bgcolor=#E9E9E9
| 388640 ||  || — || October 9, 2007 || Socorro || LINEAR || MRX || align=right | 1.0 km || 
|-id=641 bgcolor=#E9E9E9
| 388641 ||  || — || October 9, 2007 || Socorro || LINEAR || — || align=right | 2.4 km || 
|-id=642 bgcolor=#E9E9E9
| 388642 ||  || — || October 11, 2007 || Socorro || LINEAR || AEO || align=right | 1.3 km || 
|-id=643 bgcolor=#E9E9E9
| 388643 ||  || — || October 4, 2007 || Catalina || CSS || GEF || align=right | 1.5 km || 
|-id=644 bgcolor=#E9E9E9
| 388644 ||  || — || October 12, 2007 || Socorro || LINEAR || — || align=right | 1.4 km || 
|-id=645 bgcolor=#E9E9E9
| 388645 ||  || — || October 4, 2007 || Kitt Peak || Spacewatch || — || align=right | 2.0 km || 
|-id=646 bgcolor=#d6d6d6
| 388646 ||  || — || October 6, 2007 || Kitt Peak || Spacewatch || — || align=right | 3.0 km || 
|-id=647 bgcolor=#E9E9E9
| 388647 ||  || — || October 6, 2007 || 7300 Observatory || W. K. Y. Yeung || HEN || align=right | 1.1 km || 
|-id=648 bgcolor=#E9E9E9
| 388648 ||  || — || October 8, 2007 || Kitt Peak || Spacewatch || — || align=right | 2.2 km || 
|-id=649 bgcolor=#E9E9E9
| 388649 ||  || — || October 9, 2007 || Mount Lemmon || Mount Lemmon Survey || HOF || align=right | 3.2 km || 
|-id=650 bgcolor=#E9E9E9
| 388650 ||  || — || February 2, 2005 || Kitt Peak || Spacewatch || AER || align=right | 1.4 km || 
|-id=651 bgcolor=#d6d6d6
| 388651 ||  || — || October 10, 2007 || Kitt Peak || Spacewatch || — || align=right | 2.9 km || 
|-id=652 bgcolor=#d6d6d6
| 388652 ||  || — || October 8, 2007 || Mount Lemmon || Mount Lemmon Survey || THM || align=right | 2.2 km || 
|-id=653 bgcolor=#E9E9E9
| 388653 ||  || — || September 11, 2007 || Mount Lemmon || Mount Lemmon Survey || WIT || align=right data-sort-value="0.86" | 860 m || 
|-id=654 bgcolor=#E9E9E9
| 388654 ||  || — || October 10, 2007 || Kitt Peak || Spacewatch || — || align=right | 1.6 km || 
|-id=655 bgcolor=#E9E9E9
| 388655 ||  || — || October 11, 2007 || Kitt Peak || Spacewatch || WIT || align=right data-sort-value="0.90" | 900 m || 
|-id=656 bgcolor=#d6d6d6
| 388656 ||  || — || October 9, 2007 || Kitt Peak || Spacewatch || — || align=right | 3.3 km || 
|-id=657 bgcolor=#E9E9E9
| 388657 ||  || — || October 9, 2007 || Kitt Peak || Spacewatch || — || align=right | 2.6 km || 
|-id=658 bgcolor=#E9E9E9
| 388658 ||  || — || October 13, 2007 || Kitt Peak || Spacewatch || — || align=right | 1.1 km || 
|-id=659 bgcolor=#E9E9E9
| 388659 ||  || — || October 11, 2007 || Catalina || CSS || GEF || align=right | 1.6 km || 
|-id=660 bgcolor=#d6d6d6
| 388660 ||  || — || October 12, 2007 || Catalina || CSS || — || align=right | 3.5 km || 
|-id=661 bgcolor=#E9E9E9
| 388661 ||  || — || October 11, 2007 || Kitt Peak || Spacewatch || GEF || align=right | 1.5 km || 
|-id=662 bgcolor=#d6d6d6
| 388662 ||  || — || October 11, 2007 || Kitt Peak || Spacewatch || — || align=right | 2.7 km || 
|-id=663 bgcolor=#d6d6d6
| 388663 ||  || — || October 11, 2007 || Kitt Peak || Spacewatch || — || align=right | 2.5 km || 
|-id=664 bgcolor=#fefefe
| 388664 ||  || — || October 13, 2007 || Catalina || CSS || H || align=right data-sort-value="0.78" | 780 m || 
|-id=665 bgcolor=#E9E9E9
| 388665 ||  || — || October 10, 2007 || Catalina || CSS || — || align=right | 3.3 km || 
|-id=666 bgcolor=#fefefe
| 388666 ||  || — || July 19, 2007 || Siding Spring || SSS || H || align=right data-sort-value="0.84" | 840 m || 
|-id=667 bgcolor=#d6d6d6
| 388667 ||  || — || October 12, 2007 || Mount Lemmon || Mount Lemmon Survey || EOS || align=right | 2.3 km || 
|-id=668 bgcolor=#E9E9E9
| 388668 ||  || — || October 14, 2007 || Mount Lemmon || Mount Lemmon Survey || IAN || align=right | 1.1 km || 
|-id=669 bgcolor=#d6d6d6
| 388669 ||  || — || October 14, 2007 || Kitt Peak || Spacewatch || KOR || align=right | 1.2 km || 
|-id=670 bgcolor=#d6d6d6
| 388670 ||  || — || September 25, 2007 || Mount Lemmon || Mount Lemmon Survey || EOS || align=right | 2.0 km || 
|-id=671 bgcolor=#E9E9E9
| 388671 ||  || — || October 15, 2007 || Kitt Peak || Spacewatch || WIT || align=right | 1.1 km || 
|-id=672 bgcolor=#E9E9E9
| 388672 ||  || — || October 9, 2007 || Kitt Peak || Spacewatch || HOF || align=right | 2.8 km || 
|-id=673 bgcolor=#d6d6d6
| 388673 ||  || — || October 9, 2007 || Kitt Peak || Spacewatch || TRE || align=right | 2.2 km || 
|-id=674 bgcolor=#d6d6d6
| 388674 ||  || — || October 12, 2007 || Kitt Peak || Spacewatch || THM || align=right | 1.9 km || 
|-id=675 bgcolor=#E9E9E9
| 388675 ||  || — || October 11, 2007 || Lulin || LUSS || — || align=right | 3.2 km || 
|-id=676 bgcolor=#d6d6d6
| 388676 ||  || — || October 10, 2007 || Mount Lemmon || Mount Lemmon Survey || KOR || align=right | 1.5 km || 
|-id=677 bgcolor=#E9E9E9
| 388677 ||  || — || October 7, 2007 || Mount Lemmon || Mount Lemmon Survey || — || align=right | 1.6 km || 
|-id=678 bgcolor=#E9E9E9
| 388678 ||  || — || October 11, 2007 || Catalina || CSS || BAR || align=right | 1.8 km || 
|-id=679 bgcolor=#E9E9E9
| 388679 ||  || — || October 18, 2007 || Kitt Peak || Spacewatch || — || align=right | 2.7 km || 
|-id=680 bgcolor=#d6d6d6
| 388680 ||  || — || October 24, 2007 || Mount Lemmon || Mount Lemmon Survey || — || align=right | 3.0 km || 
|-id=681 bgcolor=#d6d6d6
| 388681 ||  || — || October 30, 2007 || Mount Lemmon || Mount Lemmon Survey || KOR || align=right | 1.2 km || 
|-id=682 bgcolor=#d6d6d6
| 388682 ||  || — || September 18, 2007 || Mount Lemmon || Mount Lemmon Survey || — || align=right | 2.6 km || 
|-id=683 bgcolor=#d6d6d6
| 388683 ||  || — || October 10, 2007 || Kitt Peak || Spacewatch || — || align=right | 2.3 km || 
|-id=684 bgcolor=#d6d6d6
| 388684 ||  || — || October 30, 2007 || Kitt Peak || Spacewatch || — || align=right | 2.1 km || 
|-id=685 bgcolor=#E9E9E9
| 388685 ||  || — || October 30, 2007 || Kitt Peak || Spacewatch || — || align=right | 2.2 km || 
|-id=686 bgcolor=#E9E9E9
| 388686 ||  || — || October 30, 2007 || Kitt Peak || Spacewatch || NEM || align=right | 2.8 km || 
|-id=687 bgcolor=#d6d6d6
| 388687 ||  || — || October 31, 2007 || Mount Lemmon || Mount Lemmon Survey || KOR || align=right | 1.3 km || 
|-id=688 bgcolor=#d6d6d6
| 388688 ||  || — || October 30, 2007 || Kitt Peak || Spacewatch || EOS || align=right | 2.1 km || 
|-id=689 bgcolor=#E9E9E9
| 388689 ||  || — || October 30, 2007 || Mount Lemmon || Mount Lemmon Survey || — || align=right | 1.4 km || 
|-id=690 bgcolor=#d6d6d6
| 388690 ||  || — || October 19, 2007 || Mount Lemmon || Mount Lemmon Survey || HYG || align=right | 3.2 km || 
|-id=691 bgcolor=#E9E9E9
| 388691 ||  || — || October 20, 2007 || Mount Lemmon || Mount Lemmon Survey || PAD || align=right | 1.8 km || 
|-id=692 bgcolor=#E9E9E9
| 388692 ||  || — || October 19, 2007 || Mount Lemmon || Mount Lemmon Survey || — || align=right | 2.0 km || 
|-id=693 bgcolor=#d6d6d6
| 388693 ||  || — || October 21, 2007 || Mount Lemmon || Mount Lemmon Survey || EOS || align=right | 1.8 km || 
|-id=694 bgcolor=#d6d6d6
| 388694 ||  || — || October 17, 2007 || Mount Lemmon || Mount Lemmon Survey || — || align=right | 2.6 km || 
|-id=695 bgcolor=#d6d6d6
| 388695 ||  || — || October 25, 2007 || Mount Lemmon || Mount Lemmon Survey || — || align=right | 3.1 km || 
|-id=696 bgcolor=#d6d6d6
| 388696 ||  || — || October 21, 2007 || Mount Lemmon || Mount Lemmon Survey || — || align=right | 3.2 km || 
|-id=697 bgcolor=#d6d6d6
| 388697 ||  || — || October 20, 2007 || Mount Lemmon || Mount Lemmon Survey || — || align=right | 2.6 km || 
|-id=698 bgcolor=#E9E9E9
| 388698 ||  || — || November 2, 2007 || Eskridge || G. Hug || — || align=right | 1.6 km || 
|-id=699 bgcolor=#d6d6d6
| 388699 ||  || — || November 2, 2007 || Kitt Peak || Spacewatch || TEL || align=right | 1.4 km || 
|-id=700 bgcolor=#d6d6d6
| 388700 ||  || — || November 3, 2007 || 7300 || W. K. Y. Yeung || — || align=right | 3.3 km || 
|}

388701–388800 

|-bgcolor=#d6d6d6
| 388701 ||  || — || November 3, 2007 || Mount Lemmon || Mount Lemmon Survey || KOR || align=right | 1.3 km || 
|-id=702 bgcolor=#E9E9E9
| 388702 ||  || — || November 1, 2007 || Kitt Peak || Spacewatch || HOF || align=right | 2.8 km || 
|-id=703 bgcolor=#d6d6d6
| 388703 ||  || — || November 1, 2007 || Kitt Peak || Spacewatch || EOS || align=right | 4.6 km || 
|-id=704 bgcolor=#d6d6d6
| 388704 ||  || — || October 14, 2007 || Mount Lemmon || Mount Lemmon Survey || — || align=right | 3.6 km || 
|-id=705 bgcolor=#d6d6d6
| 388705 ||  || — || November 1, 2007 || Kitt Peak || Spacewatch || — || align=right | 1.8 km || 
|-id=706 bgcolor=#d6d6d6
| 388706 ||  || — || November 1, 2007 || Kitt Peak || Spacewatch || EOS || align=right | 2.1 km || 
|-id=707 bgcolor=#E9E9E9
| 388707 ||  || — || November 4, 2007 || Kitt Peak || Spacewatch || — || align=right | 2.2 km || 
|-id=708 bgcolor=#E9E9E9
| 388708 ||  || — || November 8, 2007 || La Sagra || OAM Obs. || — || align=right | 2.6 km || 
|-id=709 bgcolor=#E9E9E9
| 388709 ||  || — || November 2, 2007 || Kitt Peak || Spacewatch || — || align=right | 3.4 km || 
|-id=710 bgcolor=#d6d6d6
| 388710 ||  || — || November 2, 2007 || Kitt Peak || Spacewatch || — || align=right | 2.8 km || 
|-id=711 bgcolor=#d6d6d6
| 388711 ||  || — || October 16, 2007 || Mount Lemmon || Mount Lemmon Survey || — || align=right | 2.6 km || 
|-id=712 bgcolor=#d6d6d6
| 388712 ||  || — || November 3, 2007 || Kitt Peak || Spacewatch || — || align=right | 1.7 km || 
|-id=713 bgcolor=#E9E9E9
| 388713 ||  || — || November 3, 2007 || Kitt Peak || Spacewatch || — || align=right | 1.5 km || 
|-id=714 bgcolor=#d6d6d6
| 388714 ||  || — || November 3, 2007 || Kitt Peak || Spacewatch || KOR || align=right | 1.3 km || 
|-id=715 bgcolor=#E9E9E9
| 388715 ||  || — || April 2, 2005 || Mount Lemmon || Mount Lemmon Survey || HOF || align=right | 2.7 km || 
|-id=716 bgcolor=#E9E9E9
| 388716 ||  || — || November 3, 2007 || Kitt Peak || Spacewatch || HEN || align=right | 1.0 km || 
|-id=717 bgcolor=#fefefe
| 388717 ||  || — || November 4, 2007 || Kitt Peak || Spacewatch || — || align=right data-sort-value="0.68" | 680 m || 
|-id=718 bgcolor=#d6d6d6
| 388718 ||  || — || November 4, 2007 || Kitt Peak || Spacewatch || — || align=right | 2.7 km || 
|-id=719 bgcolor=#E9E9E9
| 388719 ||  || — || November 4, 2007 || Kitt Peak || Spacewatch || HOF || align=right | 3.2 km || 
|-id=720 bgcolor=#E9E9E9
| 388720 ||  || — || November 5, 2007 || Kitt Peak || Spacewatch || WIT || align=right | 1.1 km || 
|-id=721 bgcolor=#d6d6d6
| 388721 ||  || — || November 5, 2007 || Kitt Peak || Spacewatch || EOS || align=right | 2.1 km || 
|-id=722 bgcolor=#d6d6d6
| 388722 ||  || — || November 5, 2007 || Kitt Peak || Spacewatch || — || align=right | 3.6 km || 
|-id=723 bgcolor=#E9E9E9
| 388723 ||  || — || November 4, 2007 || Mount Lemmon || Mount Lemmon Survey || HEN || align=right | 1.1 km || 
|-id=724 bgcolor=#d6d6d6
| 388724 ||  || — || November 4, 2007 || Mount Lemmon || Mount Lemmon Survey || THM || align=right | 2.4 km || 
|-id=725 bgcolor=#d6d6d6
| 388725 ||  || — || November 4, 2007 || Mount Lemmon || Mount Lemmon Survey || THM || align=right | 2.3 km || 
|-id=726 bgcolor=#E9E9E9
| 388726 ||  || — || October 30, 2007 || Mount Lemmon || Mount Lemmon Survey || — || align=right | 1.5 km || 
|-id=727 bgcolor=#d6d6d6
| 388727 ||  || — || November 9, 2007 || Kitt Peak || Spacewatch || KAR || align=right | 1.1 km || 
|-id=728 bgcolor=#d6d6d6
| 388728 ||  || — || October 18, 2007 || Kitt Peak || Spacewatch || THM || align=right | 2.3 km || 
|-id=729 bgcolor=#E9E9E9
| 388729 ||  || — || November 9, 2007 || Kitt Peak || Spacewatch || MRX || align=right | 1.1 km || 
|-id=730 bgcolor=#E9E9E9
| 388730 ||  || — || November 11, 2007 || Mount Lemmon || Mount Lemmon Survey || — || align=right | 2.2 km || 
|-id=731 bgcolor=#d6d6d6
| 388731 ||  || — || November 13, 2007 || Mount Lemmon || Mount Lemmon Survey || KOR || align=right | 1.1 km || 
|-id=732 bgcolor=#d6d6d6
| 388732 ||  || — || October 9, 2007 || Kitt Peak || Spacewatch || — || align=right | 3.0 km || 
|-id=733 bgcolor=#d6d6d6
| 388733 ||  || — || November 2, 2007 || Mount Lemmon || Mount Lemmon Survey || — || align=right | 3.1 km || 
|-id=734 bgcolor=#E9E9E9
| 388734 ||  || — || November 13, 2007 || Kitt Peak || Spacewatch || NEM || align=right | 2.8 km || 
|-id=735 bgcolor=#E9E9E9
| 388735 ||  || — || November 13, 2007 || Mount Lemmon || Mount Lemmon Survey || HNA || align=right | 3.1 km || 
|-id=736 bgcolor=#d6d6d6
| 388736 ||  || — || November 11, 2007 || Cerro Burek || Alianza S4 Obs. || — || align=right | 3.1 km || 
|-id=737 bgcolor=#E9E9E9
| 388737 ||  || — || November 14, 2007 || Kitt Peak || Spacewatch || HOFfast? || align=right | 3.0 km || 
|-id=738 bgcolor=#E9E9E9
| 388738 ||  || — || November 14, 2007 || Kitt Peak || Spacewatch || — || align=right | 2.3 km || 
|-id=739 bgcolor=#d6d6d6
| 388739 ||  || — || November 14, 2007 || Kitt Peak || Spacewatch || — || align=right | 2.4 km || 
|-id=740 bgcolor=#d6d6d6
| 388740 ||  || — || November 2, 2007 || Mount Lemmon || Mount Lemmon Survey || — || align=right | 3.4 km || 
|-id=741 bgcolor=#d6d6d6
| 388741 ||  || — || November 5, 2007 || Mount Lemmon || Mount Lemmon Survey || — || align=right | 3.2 km || 
|-id=742 bgcolor=#E9E9E9
| 388742 ||  || — || November 8, 2007 || Kitt Peak || Spacewatch || — || align=right | 2.6 km || 
|-id=743 bgcolor=#d6d6d6
| 388743 ||  || — || November 4, 2007 || Mount Lemmon || Mount Lemmon Survey || EOS || align=right | 2.1 km || 
|-id=744 bgcolor=#d6d6d6
| 388744 ||  || — || November 1, 2007 || Kitt Peak || Spacewatch || — || align=right | 2.7 km || 
|-id=745 bgcolor=#d6d6d6
| 388745 ||  || — || November 7, 2007 || Kitt Peak || Spacewatch || — || align=right | 3.0 km || 
|-id=746 bgcolor=#E9E9E9
| 388746 ||  || — || November 14, 2007 || Kitt Peak || Spacewatch || GEF || align=right | 1.3 km || 
|-id=747 bgcolor=#E9E9E9
| 388747 ||  || — || April 2, 2005 || Kitt Peak || Spacewatch || AGN || align=right | 1.4 km || 
|-id=748 bgcolor=#d6d6d6
| 388748 ||  || — || November 11, 2007 || Mount Lemmon || Mount Lemmon Survey || — || align=right | 3.4 km || 
|-id=749 bgcolor=#d6d6d6
| 388749 ||  || — || November 17, 2007 || La Sagra || OAM Obs. || EOS || align=right | 3.8 km || 
|-id=750 bgcolor=#d6d6d6
| 388750 ||  || — || November 18, 2007 || Mount Lemmon || Mount Lemmon Survey || Tj (2.93) || align=right | 4.7 km || 
|-id=751 bgcolor=#d6d6d6
| 388751 ||  || — || November 16, 2007 || Socorro || LINEAR || — || align=right | 2.9 km || 
|-id=752 bgcolor=#d6d6d6
| 388752 ||  || — || October 24, 2007 || Mount Lemmon || Mount Lemmon Survey || — || align=right | 3.7 km || 
|-id=753 bgcolor=#E9E9E9
| 388753 ||  || — || November 17, 2007 || Kitt Peak || Spacewatch || — || align=right | 2.6 km || 
|-id=754 bgcolor=#d6d6d6
| 388754 ||  || — || November 18, 2007 || Mount Lemmon || Mount Lemmon Survey || — || align=right | 2.4 km || 
|-id=755 bgcolor=#d6d6d6
| 388755 ||  || — || November 19, 2007 || Kitt Peak || Spacewatch || CHA || align=right | 2.2 km || 
|-id=756 bgcolor=#d6d6d6
| 388756 ||  || — || November 8, 2007 || Catalina || CSS || — || align=right | 2.8 km || 
|-id=757 bgcolor=#d6d6d6
| 388757 ||  || — || November 29, 2007 || Lulin || LUSS || — || align=right | 3.1 km || 
|-id=758 bgcolor=#d6d6d6
| 388758 ||  || — || December 12, 2007 || Socorro || LINEAR || JLI || align=right | 3.7 km || 
|-id=759 bgcolor=#d6d6d6
| 388759 ||  || — || December 13, 2007 || Pla D'Arguines || R. Ferrando || — || align=right | 2.2 km || 
|-id=760 bgcolor=#E9E9E9
| 388760 ||  || — || December 15, 2007 || Catalina || CSS || — || align=right | 2.2 km || 
|-id=761 bgcolor=#d6d6d6
| 388761 ||  || — || November 4, 2007 || Socorro || LINEAR || — || align=right | 3.2 km || 
|-id=762 bgcolor=#d6d6d6
| 388762 ||  || — || November 5, 2007 || Mount Lemmon || Mount Lemmon Survey || THM || align=right | 2.0 km || 
|-id=763 bgcolor=#d6d6d6
| 388763 ||  || — || December 15, 2007 || Kitt Peak || Spacewatch || EOS || align=right | 2.2 km || 
|-id=764 bgcolor=#d6d6d6
| 388764 ||  || — || December 14, 2007 || Mount Lemmon || Mount Lemmon Survey || — || align=right | 3.1 km || 
|-id=765 bgcolor=#d6d6d6
| 388765 ||  || — || December 3, 2007 || Kitt Peak || Spacewatch || — || align=right | 2.7 km || 
|-id=766 bgcolor=#d6d6d6
| 388766 ||  || — || November 2, 2007 || Mount Lemmon || Mount Lemmon Survey || — || align=right | 4.0 km || 
|-id=767 bgcolor=#d6d6d6
| 388767 ||  || — || December 14, 2007 || Mount Lemmon || Mount Lemmon Survey || — || align=right | 3.2 km || 
|-id=768 bgcolor=#d6d6d6
| 388768 ||  || — || December 16, 2007 || Kitt Peak || Spacewatch || — || align=right | 2.6 km || 
|-id=769 bgcolor=#d6d6d6
| 388769 ||  || — || December 5, 2007 || Kitt Peak || Spacewatch || HYG || align=right | 2.3 km || 
|-id=770 bgcolor=#d6d6d6
| 388770 ||  || — || December 18, 2007 || Kitt Peak || Spacewatch || — || align=right | 3.3 km || 
|-id=771 bgcolor=#d6d6d6
| 388771 ||  || — || November 9, 2007 || Kitt Peak || Spacewatch || — || align=right | 2.2 km || 
|-id=772 bgcolor=#d6d6d6
| 388772 ||  || — || December 30, 2007 || Mount Lemmon || Mount Lemmon Survey || EOS || align=right | 2.2 km || 
|-id=773 bgcolor=#d6d6d6
| 388773 ||  || — || December 30, 2007 || Mount Lemmon || Mount Lemmon Survey || — || align=right | 3.6 km || 
|-id=774 bgcolor=#d6d6d6
| 388774 ||  || — || December 30, 2007 || Mount Lemmon || Mount Lemmon Survey || — || align=right | 3.2 km || 
|-id=775 bgcolor=#d6d6d6
| 388775 ||  || — || November 12, 2007 || Catalina || CSS || — || align=right | 3.3 km || 
|-id=776 bgcolor=#d6d6d6
| 388776 ||  || — || December 31, 2007 || Kitt Peak || Spacewatch || — || align=right | 3.3 km || 
|-id=777 bgcolor=#d6d6d6
| 388777 ||  || — || December 31, 2007 || Catalina || CSS || TIR || align=right | 3.6 km || 
|-id=778 bgcolor=#d6d6d6
| 388778 ||  || — || December 31, 2007 || Mount Lemmon || Mount Lemmon Survey || — || align=right | 2.7 km || 
|-id=779 bgcolor=#d6d6d6
| 388779 ||  || — || December 18, 2007 || Socorro || LINEAR || EOS || align=right | 2.6 km || 
|-id=780 bgcolor=#d6d6d6
| 388780 ||  || — || January 10, 2008 || Mount Lemmon || Mount Lemmon Survey || — || align=right | 3.3 km || 
|-id=781 bgcolor=#d6d6d6
| 388781 ||  || — || January 10, 2008 || Mount Lemmon || Mount Lemmon Survey || — || align=right | 4.7 km || 
|-id=782 bgcolor=#d6d6d6
| 388782 ||  || — || January 11, 2008 || Desert Eagle || W. K. Y. Yeung || TIR || align=right | 3.1 km || 
|-id=783 bgcolor=#d6d6d6
| 388783 ||  || — || October 19, 2007 || Mount Lemmon || Mount Lemmon Survey || — || align=right | 3.0 km || 
|-id=784 bgcolor=#d6d6d6
| 388784 ||  || — || December 30, 2007 || Kitt Peak || Spacewatch || — || align=right | 5.2 km || 
|-id=785 bgcolor=#d6d6d6
| 388785 ||  || — || January 10, 2008 || Mount Lemmon || Mount Lemmon Survey || EOS || align=right | 2.2 km || 
|-id=786 bgcolor=#d6d6d6
| 388786 ||  || — || January 10, 2008 || Mount Lemmon || Mount Lemmon Survey || URS || align=right | 2.8 km || 
|-id=787 bgcolor=#d6d6d6
| 388787 ||  || — || December 3, 2007 || Kitt Peak || Spacewatch || — || align=right | 3.6 km || 
|-id=788 bgcolor=#d6d6d6
| 388788 ||  || — || January 12, 2008 || Mount Lemmon || Mount Lemmon Survey || — || align=right | 2.6 km || 
|-id=789 bgcolor=#d6d6d6
| 388789 ||  || — || January 13, 2008 || Mount Lemmon || Mount Lemmon Survey || — || align=right | 3.4 km || 
|-id=790 bgcolor=#d6d6d6
| 388790 ||  || — || November 3, 2007 || Mount Lemmon || Mount Lemmon Survey || — || align=right | 3.1 km || 
|-id=791 bgcolor=#d6d6d6
| 388791 ||  || — || January 14, 2008 || Kitt Peak || Spacewatch || — || align=right | 3.0 km || 
|-id=792 bgcolor=#d6d6d6
| 388792 ||  || — || January 14, 2008 || Kitt Peak || Spacewatch || — || align=right | 2.8 km || 
|-id=793 bgcolor=#d6d6d6
| 388793 ||  || — || January 15, 2008 || Mount Lemmon || Mount Lemmon Survey || — || align=right | 3.1 km || 
|-id=794 bgcolor=#d6d6d6
| 388794 ||  || — || January 11, 2008 || Mount Lemmon || Mount Lemmon Survey || — || align=right | 3.1 km || 
|-id=795 bgcolor=#d6d6d6
| 388795 ||  || — || January 1, 2008 || Kitt Peak || Spacewatch || — || align=right | 2.9 km || 
|-id=796 bgcolor=#d6d6d6
| 388796 ||  || — || January 10, 2008 || Mount Lemmon || Mount Lemmon Survey || — || align=right | 2.5 km || 
|-id=797 bgcolor=#d6d6d6
| 388797 ||  || — || January 15, 2008 || Mount Lemmon || Mount Lemmon Survey || — || align=right | 3.9 km || 
|-id=798 bgcolor=#FFC2E0
| 388798 ||  || — || January 19, 2008 || Mount Lemmon || Mount Lemmon Survey || APO || align=right data-sort-value="0.73" | 730 m || 
|-id=799 bgcolor=#d6d6d6
| 388799 ||  || — || December 18, 2007 || Mount Lemmon || Mount Lemmon Survey || VER || align=right | 2.6 km || 
|-id=800 bgcolor=#d6d6d6
| 388800 ||  || — || January 16, 2008 || Kitt Peak || Spacewatch || — || align=right | 2.9 km || 
|}

388801–388900 

|-bgcolor=#d6d6d6
| 388801 ||  || — || January 16, 2008 || Kitt Peak || Spacewatch || HYG || align=right | 3.0 km || 
|-id=802 bgcolor=#d6d6d6
| 388802 ||  || — || January 18, 2008 || Kitt Peak || Spacewatch || EOS || align=right | 2.5 km || 
|-id=803 bgcolor=#d6d6d6
| 388803 ||  || — || March 23, 2003 || Kitt Peak || Spacewatch || MEL || align=right | 3.6 km || 
|-id=804 bgcolor=#d6d6d6
| 388804 ||  || — || December 31, 2007 || Kitt Peak || Spacewatch || HYG || align=right | 2.5 km || 
|-id=805 bgcolor=#d6d6d6
| 388805 ||  || — || January 30, 2008 || Mount Lemmon || Mount Lemmon Survey || — || align=right | 3.5 km || 
|-id=806 bgcolor=#d6d6d6
| 388806 ||  || — || January 30, 2008 || La Sagra || OAM Obs. || — || align=right | 5.8 km || 
|-id=807 bgcolor=#d6d6d6
| 388807 ||  || — || December 15, 2007 || Kitt Peak || Spacewatch || — || align=right | 3.0 km || 
|-id=808 bgcolor=#d6d6d6
| 388808 ||  || — || January 30, 2008 || Mount Lemmon || Mount Lemmon Survey || THM || align=right | 2.1 km || 
|-id=809 bgcolor=#d6d6d6
| 388809 ||  || — || January 30, 2008 || Catalina || CSS || URS || align=right | 4.9 km || 
|-id=810 bgcolor=#d6d6d6
| 388810 ||  || — || January 10, 2008 || Mount Lemmon || Mount Lemmon Survey || — || align=right | 3.3 km || 
|-id=811 bgcolor=#d6d6d6
| 388811 ||  || — || January 16, 2008 || Kitt Peak || Spacewatch || — || align=right | 4.5 km || 
|-id=812 bgcolor=#d6d6d6
| 388812 ||  || — || January 30, 2008 || Catalina || CSS || — || align=right | 3.9 km || 
|-id=813 bgcolor=#d6d6d6
| 388813 ||  || — || February 3, 2008 || Altschwendt || W. Ries || — || align=right | 4.3 km || 
|-id=814 bgcolor=#d6d6d6
| 388814 ||  || — || January 11, 2008 || Kitt Peak || Spacewatch || — || align=right | 3.4 km || 
|-id=815 bgcolor=#d6d6d6
| 388815 ||  || — || February 3, 2008 || Kitt Peak || Spacewatch || — || align=right | 2.9 km || 
|-id=816 bgcolor=#d6d6d6
| 388816 ||  || — || February 2, 2008 || Kitt Peak || Spacewatch || — || align=right | 3.1 km || 
|-id=817 bgcolor=#d6d6d6
| 388817 ||  || — || February 8, 2008 || Mount Lemmon || Mount Lemmon Survey || — || align=right | 5.1 km || 
|-id=818 bgcolor=#d6d6d6
| 388818 ||  || — || February 6, 2008 || Catalina || CSS || — || align=right | 3.2 km || 
|-id=819 bgcolor=#d6d6d6
| 388819 ||  || — || October 16, 2006 || Catalina || CSS || EOS || align=right | 2.8 km || 
|-id=820 bgcolor=#d6d6d6
| 388820 ||  || — || February 8, 2008 || Kitt Peak || Spacewatch || — || align=right | 3.1 km || 
|-id=821 bgcolor=#d6d6d6
| 388821 ||  || — || February 9, 2008 || Mount Lemmon || Mount Lemmon Survey || — || align=right | 2.8 km || 
|-id=822 bgcolor=#d6d6d6
| 388822 ||  || — || February 9, 2008 || Kitt Peak || Spacewatch || — || align=right | 3.1 km || 
|-id=823 bgcolor=#d6d6d6
| 388823 ||  || — || March 11, 2003 || Kitt Peak || Spacewatch || LIX || align=right | 4.1 km || 
|-id=824 bgcolor=#d6d6d6
| 388824 ||  || — || February 7, 2008 || Kitt Peak || Spacewatch || URS || align=right | 3.6 km || 
|-id=825 bgcolor=#d6d6d6
| 388825 ||  || — || February 8, 2008 || Mount Lemmon || Mount Lemmon Survey || — || align=right | 3.7 km || 
|-id=826 bgcolor=#d6d6d6
| 388826 ||  || — || February 9, 2008 || Kitt Peak || Spacewatch || — || align=right | 3.2 km || 
|-id=827 bgcolor=#d6d6d6
| 388827 ||  || — || August 19, 2006 || Kitt Peak || Spacewatch || EUP || align=right | 3.6 km || 
|-id=828 bgcolor=#d6d6d6
| 388828 ||  || — || February 12, 2008 || Kitt Peak || Spacewatch || — || align=right | 2.8 km || 
|-id=829 bgcolor=#d6d6d6
| 388829 ||  || — || February 3, 2008 || Catalina || CSS || EUP || align=right | 4.8 km || 
|-id=830 bgcolor=#d6d6d6
| 388830 ||  || — || February 24, 2008 || Mount Lemmon || Mount Lemmon Survey || TIR || align=right | 3.1 km || 
|-id=831 bgcolor=#d6d6d6
| 388831 ||  || — || January 15, 2008 || Mount Lemmon || Mount Lemmon Survey || — || align=right | 2.6 km || 
|-id=832 bgcolor=#d6d6d6
| 388832 ||  || — || February 25, 2008 || Kitt Peak || Spacewatch || — || align=right | 3.1 km || 
|-id=833 bgcolor=#d6d6d6
| 388833 ||  || — || February 26, 2008 || Kitt Peak || Spacewatch || — || align=right | 2.7 km || 
|-id=834 bgcolor=#d6d6d6
| 388834 ||  || — || February 27, 2008 || Kitt Peak || Spacewatch || — || align=right | 3.2 km || 
|-id=835 bgcolor=#d6d6d6
| 388835 ||  || — || February 27, 2008 || Catalina || CSS || — || align=right | 5.8 km || 
|-id=836 bgcolor=#d6d6d6
| 388836 ||  || — || March 27, 2003 || Kitt Peak || Spacewatch || — || align=right | 3.2 km || 
|-id=837 bgcolor=#d6d6d6
| 388837 ||  || — || February 29, 2008 || Kitt Peak || Spacewatch || — || align=right | 5.5 km || 
|-id=838 bgcolor=#FFC2E0
| 388838 ||  || — || March 4, 2008 || Mount Lemmon || Mount Lemmon Survey || AMO || align=right data-sort-value="0.38" | 380 m || 
|-id=839 bgcolor=#FA8072
| 388839 ||  || — || March 6, 2008 || Kitt Peak || Spacewatch || — || align=right data-sort-value="0.47" | 470 m || 
|-id=840 bgcolor=#d6d6d6
| 388840 ||  || — || March 2, 2008 || Mount Lemmon || Mount Lemmon Survey || — || align=right | 3.2 km || 
|-id=841 bgcolor=#d6d6d6
| 388841 ||  || — || March 4, 2008 || Kitt Peak || Spacewatch || — || align=right | 3.5 km || 
|-id=842 bgcolor=#d6d6d6
| 388842 ||  || — || March 7, 2008 || Kitt Peak || Spacewatch || 7:4 || align=right | 4.1 km || 
|-id=843 bgcolor=#d6d6d6
| 388843 ||  || — || March 7, 2008 || Kitt Peak || Spacewatch || — || align=right | 3.9 km || 
|-id=844 bgcolor=#d6d6d6
| 388844 ||  || — || January 13, 2002 || Socorro || LINEAR || — || align=right | 3.5 km || 
|-id=845 bgcolor=#E9E9E9
| 388845 ||  || — || March 6, 2008 || Mount Lemmon || Mount Lemmon Survey || — || align=right | 1.4 km || 
|-id=846 bgcolor=#d6d6d6
| 388846 ||  || — || March 8, 2008 || Mount Lemmon || Mount Lemmon Survey || — || align=right | 2.9 km || 
|-id=847 bgcolor=#d6d6d6
| 388847 ||  || — || March 9, 2008 || Mount Lemmon || Mount Lemmon Survey || — || align=right | 3.5 km || 
|-id=848 bgcolor=#E9E9E9
| 388848 ||  || — || March 25, 2008 || Kitt Peak || Spacewatch || MIS || align=right | 2.4 km || 
|-id=849 bgcolor=#fefefe
| 388849 ||  || — || March 31, 2008 || Mount Lemmon || Mount Lemmon Survey || — || align=right data-sort-value="0.83" | 830 m || 
|-id=850 bgcolor=#C2FFFF
| 388850 ||  || — || March 31, 2008 || Kitt Peak || Spacewatch || L5 || align=right | 9.4 km || 
|-id=851 bgcolor=#d6d6d6
| 388851 ||  || — || April 4, 2008 || Mount Lemmon || Mount Lemmon Survey || — || align=right | 3.2 km || 
|-id=852 bgcolor=#d6d6d6
| 388852 ||  || — || February 28, 2008 || Mount Lemmon || Mount Lemmon Survey || 7:4 || align=right | 3.4 km || 
|-id=853 bgcolor=#d6d6d6
| 388853 ||  || — || April 7, 2008 || Kitt Peak || Spacewatch || Tj (2.97) || align=right | 3.0 km || 
|-id=854 bgcolor=#d6d6d6
| 388854 ||  || — || April 9, 2008 || Kitt Peak || Spacewatch || — || align=right | 3.1 km || 
|-id=855 bgcolor=#d6d6d6
| 388855 ||  || — || March 28, 2008 || Kitt Peak || Spacewatch || — || align=right | 3.2 km || 
|-id=856 bgcolor=#d6d6d6
| 388856 ||  || — || April 11, 2008 || Mount Lemmon || Mount Lemmon Survey || 7:4 || align=right | 3.3 km || 
|-id=857 bgcolor=#fefefe
| 388857 ||  || — || April 4, 2008 || Kitt Peak || Spacewatch || — || align=right data-sort-value="0.73" | 730 m || 
|-id=858 bgcolor=#fefefe
| 388858 ||  || — || April 27, 2008 || Kitt Peak || Spacewatch || — || align=right data-sort-value="0.67" | 670 m || 
|-id=859 bgcolor=#fefefe
| 388859 ||  || — || April 29, 2008 || Kitt Peak || Spacewatch || — || align=right data-sort-value="0.51" | 510 m || 
|-id=860 bgcolor=#d6d6d6
| 388860 ||  || — || May 7, 2008 || Kitt Peak || Spacewatch || — || align=right | 2.9 km || 
|-id=861 bgcolor=#fefefe
| 388861 ||  || — || July 28, 2008 || Mount Lemmon || Mount Lemmon Survey || V || align=right data-sort-value="0.59" | 590 m || 
|-id=862 bgcolor=#fefefe
| 388862 ||  || — || July 31, 2008 || Mount Lemmon || Mount Lemmon Survey || — || align=right data-sort-value="0.75" | 750 m || 
|-id=863 bgcolor=#fefefe
| 388863 ||  || — || August 7, 2008 || Hibiscus || S. F. Hönig, N. Teamo || — || align=right | 1.2 km || 
|-id=864 bgcolor=#fefefe
| 388864 ||  || — || July 30, 2008 || Kitt Peak || Spacewatch || — || align=right data-sort-value="0.85" | 850 m || 
|-id=865 bgcolor=#fefefe
| 388865 ||  || — || August 24, 2008 || Bisei SG Center || BATTeRS || — || align=right | 1.4 km || 
|-id=866 bgcolor=#fefefe
| 388866 ||  || — || August 26, 2008 || La Sagra || OAM Obs. || FLO || align=right data-sort-value="0.69" | 690 m || 
|-id=867 bgcolor=#fefefe
| 388867 ||  || — || August 27, 2008 || La Sagra || OAM Obs. || V || align=right data-sort-value="0.82" | 820 m || 
|-id=868 bgcolor=#E9E9E9
| 388868 ||  || — || August 30, 2008 || Drebach || Drebach Obs. || — || align=right | 1.9 km || 
|-id=869 bgcolor=#fefefe
| 388869 ||  || — || August 20, 2008 || Kitt Peak || Spacewatch || — || align=right | 1.2 km || 
|-id=870 bgcolor=#fefefe
| 388870 ||  || — || September 2, 2008 || Pla D'Arguines || R. Ferrando || — || align=right data-sort-value="0.87" | 870 m || 
|-id=871 bgcolor=#fefefe
| 388871 ||  || — || September 2, 2008 || Kitt Peak || Spacewatch || — || align=right | 1.0 km || 
|-id=872 bgcolor=#fefefe
| 388872 ||  || — || September 2, 2008 || Kitt Peak || Spacewatch || — || align=right data-sort-value="0.73" | 730 m || 
|-id=873 bgcolor=#E9E9E9
| 388873 ||  || — || September 4, 2008 || Kitt Peak || Spacewatch || MAR || align=right | 1.1 km || 
|-id=874 bgcolor=#C2FFFF
| 388874 ||  || — || September 4, 2008 || Kitt Peak || Spacewatch || L4 || align=right | 9.3 km || 
|-id=875 bgcolor=#fefefe
| 388875 ||  || — || September 4, 2008 || Kitt Peak || Spacewatch || — || align=right data-sort-value="0.75" | 750 m || 
|-id=876 bgcolor=#C2FFFF
| 388876 ||  || — || September 2, 2008 || Kitt Peak || Spacewatch || L4006 || align=right | 12 km || 
|-id=877 bgcolor=#fefefe
| 388877 ||  || — || September 2, 2008 || Kitt Peak || Spacewatch || V || align=right data-sort-value="0.67" | 670 m || 
|-id=878 bgcolor=#E9E9E9
| 388878 ||  || — || September 2, 2008 || Kitt Peak || Spacewatch || — || align=right data-sort-value="0.75" | 750 m || 
|-id=879 bgcolor=#C2FFFF
| 388879 ||  || — || September 3, 2008 || Kitt Peak || Spacewatch || L4 || align=right | 9.2 km || 
|-id=880 bgcolor=#fefefe
| 388880 ||  || — || September 4, 2008 || Kitt Peak || Spacewatch || — || align=right data-sort-value="0.87" | 870 m || 
|-id=881 bgcolor=#E9E9E9
| 388881 ||  || — || September 4, 2008 || Kitt Peak || Spacewatch || — || align=right | 1.4 km || 
|-id=882 bgcolor=#fefefe
| 388882 ||  || — || September 4, 2008 || Kitt Peak || Spacewatch || — || align=right data-sort-value="0.62" | 620 m || 
|-id=883 bgcolor=#fefefe
| 388883 ||  || — || September 5, 2008 || Kitt Peak || Spacewatch || — || align=right data-sort-value="0.89" | 890 m || 
|-id=884 bgcolor=#fefefe
| 388884 ||  || — || December 27, 2006 || Mount Lemmon || Mount Lemmon Survey || FLO || align=right data-sort-value="0.70" | 700 m || 
|-id=885 bgcolor=#fefefe
| 388885 ||  || — || September 6, 2008 || Kitt Peak || Spacewatch || V || align=right data-sort-value="0.72" | 720 m || 
|-id=886 bgcolor=#E9E9E9
| 388886 ||  || — || September 5, 2008 || Kitt Peak || Spacewatch || JUN || align=right data-sort-value="0.93" | 930 m || 
|-id=887 bgcolor=#C2FFFF
| 388887 ||  || — || September 3, 2008 || Kitt Peak || Spacewatch || L4 || align=right | 7.7 km || 
|-id=888 bgcolor=#E9E9E9
| 388888 ||  || — || September 7, 2008 || Catalina || CSS || — || align=right | 2.2 km || 
|-id=889 bgcolor=#C2FFFF
| 388889 ||  || — || September 6, 2008 || Kitt Peak || Spacewatch || L4 || align=right | 7.8 km || 
|-id=890 bgcolor=#E9E9E9
| 388890 ||  || — || September 7, 2008 || Mount Lemmon || Mount Lemmon Survey || MAR || align=right data-sort-value="0.79" | 790 m || 
|-id=891 bgcolor=#C2FFFF
| 388891 ||  || — || September 5, 2008 || Kitt Peak || Spacewatch || L4ERY || align=right | 7.3 km || 
|-id=892 bgcolor=#fefefe
| 388892 ||  || — || September 9, 2008 || Siding Spring || SSS || — || align=right | 1.1 km || 
|-id=893 bgcolor=#E9E9E9
| 388893 ||  || — || September 5, 2008 || Socorro || LINEAR || BRG || align=right | 1.8 km || 
|-id=894 bgcolor=#E9E9E9
| 388894 ||  || — || September 5, 2008 || Kitt Peak || Spacewatch || — || align=right data-sort-value="0.98" | 980 m || 
|-id=895 bgcolor=#E9E9E9
| 388895 ||  || — || September 21, 2008 || Grove Creek || F. Tozzi || — || align=right | 1.9 km || 
|-id=896 bgcolor=#fefefe
| 388896 ||  || — || September 22, 2008 || Socorro || LINEAR || — || align=right | 1.0 km || 
|-id=897 bgcolor=#fefefe
| 388897 ||  || — || September 22, 2008 || Socorro || LINEAR || V || align=right data-sort-value="0.92" | 920 m || 
|-id=898 bgcolor=#C2FFFF
| 388898 ||  || — || September 19, 2008 || Kitt Peak || Spacewatch || L4 || align=right | 8.6 km || 
|-id=899 bgcolor=#E9E9E9
| 388899 ||  || — || September 5, 2008 || Kitt Peak || Spacewatch || — || align=right | 2.4 km || 
|-id=900 bgcolor=#fefefe
| 388900 ||  || — || September 20, 2008 || Kitt Peak || Spacewatch || V || align=right data-sort-value="0.83" | 830 m || 
|}

388901–389000 

|-bgcolor=#fefefe
| 388901 ||  || — || September 20, 2008 || Mount Lemmon || Mount Lemmon Survey || SVE || align=right | 2.5 km || 
|-id=902 bgcolor=#E9E9E9
| 388902 ||  || — || September 20, 2008 || Kitt Peak || Spacewatch || — || align=right | 1.5 km || 
|-id=903 bgcolor=#C2FFFF
| 388903 ||  || — || September 20, 2008 || Mount Lemmon || Mount Lemmon Survey || L4HEK || align=right | 12 km || 
|-id=904 bgcolor=#E9E9E9
| 388904 ||  || — || September 20, 2008 || Mount Lemmon || Mount Lemmon Survey || — || align=right data-sort-value="0.89" | 890 m || 
|-id=905 bgcolor=#fefefe
| 388905 ||  || — || September 21, 2008 || Catalina || CSS || FLO || align=right data-sort-value="0.74" | 740 m || 
|-id=906 bgcolor=#E9E9E9
| 388906 ||  || — || September 21, 2008 || Mount Lemmon || Mount Lemmon Survey || PAL || align=right | 2.3 km || 
|-id=907 bgcolor=#E9E9E9
| 388907 ||  || — || September 22, 2008 || Kitt Peak || Spacewatch || — || align=right data-sort-value="0.98" | 980 m || 
|-id=908 bgcolor=#fefefe
| 388908 ||  || — || September 22, 2008 || Mount Lemmon || Mount Lemmon Survey || — || align=right data-sort-value="0.86" | 860 m || 
|-id=909 bgcolor=#E9E9E9
| 388909 ||  || — || September 23, 2008 || Mount Lemmon || Mount Lemmon Survey || — || align=right | 1.0 km || 
|-id=910 bgcolor=#fefefe
| 388910 ||  || — || August 22, 2004 || Kitt Peak || Spacewatch || — || align=right data-sort-value="0.91" | 910 m || 
|-id=911 bgcolor=#E9E9E9
| 388911 ||  || — || September 21, 2008 || Kitt Peak || Spacewatch || — || align=right data-sort-value="0.72" | 720 m || 
|-id=912 bgcolor=#E9E9E9
| 388912 ||  || — || September 21, 2008 || Kitt Peak || Spacewatch || JUN || align=right data-sort-value="0.94" | 940 m || 
|-id=913 bgcolor=#E9E9E9
| 388913 ||  || — || September 22, 2008 || Kitt Peak || Spacewatch || — || align=right | 1.1 km || 
|-id=914 bgcolor=#fefefe
| 388914 ||  || — || September 22, 2008 || Kitt Peak || Spacewatch || — || align=right data-sort-value="0.99" | 990 m || 
|-id=915 bgcolor=#E9E9E9
| 388915 ||  || — || September 22, 2008 || Kitt Peak || Spacewatch || — || align=right data-sort-value="0.76" | 760 m || 
|-id=916 bgcolor=#fefefe
| 388916 ||  || — || September 22, 2008 || Mount Lemmon || Mount Lemmon Survey || MAS || align=right data-sort-value="0.88" | 880 m || 
|-id=917 bgcolor=#E9E9E9
| 388917 ||  || — || September 22, 2008 || Mount Lemmon || Mount Lemmon Survey || — || align=right | 2.7 km || 
|-id=918 bgcolor=#E9E9E9
| 388918 ||  || — || September 22, 2008 || Mount Lemmon || Mount Lemmon Survey || — || align=right data-sort-value="0.87" | 870 m || 
|-id=919 bgcolor=#E9E9E9
| 388919 ||  || — || September 22, 2008 || Mount Lemmon || Mount Lemmon Survey || — || align=right | 1.4 km || 
|-id=920 bgcolor=#fefefe
| 388920 ||  || — || September 22, 2008 || Kitt Peak || Spacewatch || V || align=right data-sort-value="0.74" | 740 m || 
|-id=921 bgcolor=#E9E9E9
| 388921 ||  || — || September 23, 2008 || Kitt Peak || Spacewatch || — || align=right | 1.4 km || 
|-id=922 bgcolor=#fefefe
| 388922 ||  || — || September 24, 2008 || Kitt Peak || Spacewatch || PHO || align=right data-sort-value="0.88" | 880 m || 
|-id=923 bgcolor=#fefefe
| 388923 ||  || — || September 21, 2008 || Catalina || CSS || — || align=right data-sort-value="0.90" | 900 m || 
|-id=924 bgcolor=#C2FFFF
| 388924 ||  || — || March 10, 2003 || Kitt Peak || Spacewatch || L4 || align=right | 12 km || 
|-id=925 bgcolor=#E9E9E9
| 388925 ||  || — || September 23, 2008 || Socorro || LINEAR || — || align=right | 2.6 km || 
|-id=926 bgcolor=#E9E9E9
| 388926 ||  || — || September 23, 2008 || Socorro || LINEAR || — || align=right | 2.0 km || 
|-id=927 bgcolor=#fefefe
| 388927 ||  || — || September 3, 2008 || Kitt Peak || Spacewatch || NYS || align=right data-sort-value="0.77" | 770 m || 
|-id=928 bgcolor=#E9E9E9
| 388928 ||  || — || September 23, 2008 || Kitt Peak || Spacewatch || — || align=right | 1.2 km || 
|-id=929 bgcolor=#fefefe
| 388929 ||  || — || September 25, 2008 || Kitt Peak || Spacewatch || — || align=right data-sort-value="0.81" | 810 m || 
|-id=930 bgcolor=#fefefe
| 388930 ||  || — || September 25, 2008 || Kitt Peak || Spacewatch || NYS || align=right data-sort-value="0.73" | 730 m || 
|-id=931 bgcolor=#fefefe
| 388931 ||  || — || September 25, 2008 || Kitt Peak || Spacewatch || — || align=right data-sort-value="0.97" | 970 m || 
|-id=932 bgcolor=#E9E9E9
| 388932 ||  || — || September 25, 2008 || Kitt Peak || Spacewatch || — || align=right data-sort-value="0.98" | 980 m || 
|-id=933 bgcolor=#E9E9E9
| 388933 ||  || — || September 26, 2008 || Kitt Peak || Spacewatch || — || align=right data-sort-value="0.96" | 960 m || 
|-id=934 bgcolor=#fefefe
| 388934 ||  || — || September 26, 2008 || Kitt Peak || Spacewatch || — || align=right data-sort-value="0.86" | 860 m || 
|-id=935 bgcolor=#C2FFFF
| 388935 ||  || — || September 28, 2008 || Mount Lemmon || Mount Lemmon Survey || L4 || align=right | 12 km || 
|-id=936 bgcolor=#E9E9E9
| 388936 ||  || — || September 29, 2008 || Kitt Peak || Spacewatch || GEF || align=right data-sort-value="0.94" | 940 m || 
|-id=937 bgcolor=#fefefe
| 388937 ||  || — || September 22, 2008 || Kitt Peak || Spacewatch || V || align=right data-sort-value="0.66" | 660 m || 
|-id=938 bgcolor=#E9E9E9
| 388938 ||  || — || September 20, 2008 || Kitt Peak || Spacewatch || — || align=right | 1.1 km || 
|-id=939 bgcolor=#E9E9E9
| 388939 ||  || — || September 23, 2008 || Mount Lemmon || Mount Lemmon Survey || — || align=right data-sort-value="0.78" | 780 m || 
|-id=940 bgcolor=#C2FFFF
| 388940 ||  || — || September 23, 2008 || Mount Lemmon || Mount Lemmon Survey || L4 || align=right | 8.9 km || 
|-id=941 bgcolor=#fefefe
| 388941 ||  || — || September 24, 2008 || Mount Lemmon || Mount Lemmon Survey || V || align=right data-sort-value="0.87" | 870 m || 
|-id=942 bgcolor=#fefefe
| 388942 ||  || — || September 20, 2008 || Kitt Peak || Spacewatch || — || align=right data-sort-value="0.82" | 820 m || 
|-id=943 bgcolor=#E9E9E9
| 388943 ||  || — || September 24, 2008 || Catalina || CSS || — || align=right | 2.2 km || 
|-id=944 bgcolor=#fefefe
| 388944 ||  || — || October 1, 2008 || Great Shefford || P. Birtwhistle || MAS || align=right data-sort-value="0.75" | 750 m || 
|-id=945 bgcolor=#FFC2E0
| 388945 ||  || — || October 6, 2008 || Mount Lemmon || Mount Lemmon Survey || APOPHA || align=right data-sort-value="0.29" | 290 m || 
|-id=946 bgcolor=#fefefe
| 388946 ||  || — || October 1, 2008 || La Sagra || OAM Obs. || — || align=right data-sort-value="0.82" | 820 m || 
|-id=947 bgcolor=#fefefe
| 388947 ||  || — || October 1, 2008 || La Sagra || OAM Obs. || — || align=right | 1.3 km || 
|-id=948 bgcolor=#E9E9E9
| 388948 ||  || — || October 1, 2008 || Mount Lemmon || Mount Lemmon Survey || — || align=right data-sort-value="0.87" | 870 m || 
|-id=949 bgcolor=#fefefe
| 388949 ||  || — || October 1, 2008 || Mount Lemmon || Mount Lemmon Survey || MAS || align=right data-sort-value="0.78" | 780 m || 
|-id=950 bgcolor=#E9E9E9
| 388950 ||  || — || October 1, 2008 || Mount Lemmon || Mount Lemmon Survey || — || align=right | 1.3 km || 
|-id=951 bgcolor=#E9E9E9
| 388951 ||  || — || October 2, 2008 || Catalina || CSS || ADE || align=right | 2.9 km || 
|-id=952 bgcolor=#fefefe
| 388952 ||  || — || October 8, 2008 || Andrushivka || Andrushivka Obs. || — || align=right | 1.1 km || 
|-id=953 bgcolor=#E9E9E9
| 388953 ||  || — || October 1, 2008 || Kitt Peak || Spacewatch || — || align=right data-sort-value="0.81" | 810 m || 
|-id=954 bgcolor=#fefefe
| 388954 ||  || — || October 1, 2008 || Mount Lemmon || Mount Lemmon Survey || — || align=right data-sort-value="0.91" | 910 m || 
|-id=955 bgcolor=#E9E9E9
| 388955 ||  || — || September 22, 2008 || Mount Lemmon || Mount Lemmon Survey || — || align=right | 1.4 km || 
|-id=956 bgcolor=#E9E9E9
| 388956 ||  || — || September 23, 2008 || Kitt Peak || Spacewatch || — || align=right data-sort-value="0.93" | 930 m || 
|-id=957 bgcolor=#E9E9E9
| 388957 ||  || — || September 23, 2008 || Mount Lemmon || Mount Lemmon Survey || — || align=right | 1.1 km || 
|-id=958 bgcolor=#d6d6d6
| 388958 ||  || — || October 2, 2008 || Kitt Peak || Spacewatch || THM || align=right | 2.0 km || 
|-id=959 bgcolor=#E9E9E9
| 388959 ||  || — || October 3, 2008 || Kitt Peak || Spacewatch || — || align=right | 2.3 km || 
|-id=960 bgcolor=#E9E9E9
| 388960 ||  || — || October 3, 2008 || Kitt Peak || Spacewatch || MIS || align=right | 2.2 km || 
|-id=961 bgcolor=#fefefe
| 388961 ||  || — || October 3, 2008 || Mount Lemmon || Mount Lemmon Survey || — || align=right data-sort-value="0.70" | 700 m || 
|-id=962 bgcolor=#E9E9E9
| 388962 ||  || — || October 3, 2008 || Kitt Peak || Spacewatch || — || align=right data-sort-value="0.77" | 770 m || 
|-id=963 bgcolor=#fefefe
| 388963 ||  || — || September 21, 2008 || Kitt Peak || Spacewatch || — || align=right data-sort-value="0.89" | 890 m || 
|-id=964 bgcolor=#E9E9E9
| 388964 ||  || — || December 13, 2004 || Campo Imperatore || CINEOS || MRX || align=right | 1.1 km || 
|-id=965 bgcolor=#E9E9E9
| 388965 ||  || — || October 3, 2008 || Kitt Peak || Spacewatch || — || align=right | 1.0 km || 
|-id=966 bgcolor=#E9E9E9
| 388966 ||  || — || October 5, 2008 || La Sagra || OAM Obs. || — || align=right | 1.3 km || 
|-id=967 bgcolor=#E9E9E9
| 388967 ||  || — || October 6, 2008 || Kitt Peak || Spacewatch || — || align=right data-sort-value="0.78" | 780 m || 
|-id=968 bgcolor=#E9E9E9
| 388968 ||  || — || September 7, 2008 || Catalina || CSS || BAR || align=right | 1.5 km || 
|-id=969 bgcolor=#fefefe
| 388969 ||  || — || October 8, 2008 || Mount Lemmon || Mount Lemmon Survey || — || align=right data-sort-value="0.98" | 980 m || 
|-id=970 bgcolor=#E9E9E9
| 388970 ||  || — || October 3, 2008 || Socorro || LINEAR || ADE || align=right | 2.1 km || 
|-id=971 bgcolor=#fefefe
| 388971 ||  || — || October 9, 2008 || Mount Lemmon || Mount Lemmon Survey || NYS || align=right data-sort-value="0.66" | 660 m || 
|-id=972 bgcolor=#C2FFFF
| 388972 ||  || — || October 2, 2008 || Kitt Peak || Spacewatch || L4 || align=right | 8.1 km || 
|-id=973 bgcolor=#E9E9E9
| 388973 ||  || — || October 1, 2008 || Kitt Peak || Spacewatch || — || align=right | 1.1 km || 
|-id=974 bgcolor=#fefefe
| 388974 ||  || — || September 3, 2008 || Kitt Peak || Spacewatch || V || align=right data-sort-value="0.85" | 850 m || 
|-id=975 bgcolor=#E9E9E9
| 388975 ||  || — || September 25, 2008 || Kitt Peak || Spacewatch || — || align=right data-sort-value="0.98" | 980 m || 
|-id=976 bgcolor=#E9E9E9
| 388976 ||  || — || October 20, 2008 || Kitt Peak || Spacewatch || MAR || align=right data-sort-value="0.92" | 920 m || 
|-id=977 bgcolor=#E9E9E9
| 388977 ||  || — || October 20, 2008 || Kitt Peak || Spacewatch || — || align=right data-sort-value="0.82" | 820 m || 
|-id=978 bgcolor=#fefefe
| 388978 ||  || — || October 20, 2008 || Kitt Peak || Spacewatch || MAS || align=right data-sort-value="0.69" | 690 m || 
|-id=979 bgcolor=#fefefe
| 388979 ||  || — || October 20, 2008 || Mount Lemmon || Mount Lemmon Survey || — || align=right data-sort-value="0.82" | 820 m || 
|-id=980 bgcolor=#fefefe
| 388980 ||  || — || October 20, 2008 || Mount Lemmon || Mount Lemmon Survey || — || align=right | 1.2 km || 
|-id=981 bgcolor=#E9E9E9
| 388981 ||  || — || October 20, 2008 || Mount Lemmon || Mount Lemmon Survey || — || align=right | 1.5 km || 
|-id=982 bgcolor=#fefefe
| 388982 ||  || — || October 21, 2008 || Kitt Peak || Spacewatch || V || align=right data-sort-value="0.83" | 830 m || 
|-id=983 bgcolor=#E9E9E9
| 388983 ||  || — || October 21, 2008 || Kitt Peak || Spacewatch || — || align=right | 3.0 km || 
|-id=984 bgcolor=#E9E9E9
| 388984 ||  || — || October 21, 2008 || Kitt Peak || Spacewatch || — || align=right | 2.5 km || 
|-id=985 bgcolor=#E9E9E9
| 388985 ||  || — || September 26, 2008 || Kitt Peak || Spacewatch || — || align=right data-sort-value="0.80" | 800 m || 
|-id=986 bgcolor=#E9E9E9
| 388986 ||  || — || October 21, 2008 || Kitt Peak || Spacewatch || — || align=right | 1.1 km || 
|-id=987 bgcolor=#E9E9E9
| 388987 ||  || — || October 21, 2008 || Mount Lemmon || Mount Lemmon Survey || — || align=right | 1.7 km || 
|-id=988 bgcolor=#E9E9E9
| 388988 ||  || — || October 3, 2008 || Mount Lemmon || Mount Lemmon Survey || — || align=right | 1.7 km || 
|-id=989 bgcolor=#E9E9E9
| 388989 ||  || — || October 1, 2008 || Kitt Peak || Spacewatch || HOF || align=right | 2.6 km || 
|-id=990 bgcolor=#E9E9E9
| 388990 ||  || — || September 24, 2008 || Kitt Peak || Spacewatch || — || align=right data-sort-value="0.82" | 820 m || 
|-id=991 bgcolor=#E9E9E9
| 388991 ||  || — || October 24, 2008 || Kitt Peak || Spacewatch || — || align=right data-sort-value="0.87" | 870 m || 
|-id=992 bgcolor=#E9E9E9
| 388992 ||  || — || October 24, 2008 || Kitt Peak || Spacewatch || — || align=right data-sort-value="0.94" | 940 m || 
|-id=993 bgcolor=#fefefe
| 388993 ||  || — || October 24, 2008 || Kitt Peak || Spacewatch || V || align=right data-sort-value="0.65" | 650 m || 
|-id=994 bgcolor=#E9E9E9
| 388994 ||  || — || September 6, 2008 || Catalina || CSS || — || align=right | 2.1 km || 
|-id=995 bgcolor=#fefefe
| 388995 ||  || — || September 29, 2008 || Catalina || CSS || ERI || align=right | 1.6 km || 
|-id=996 bgcolor=#E9E9E9
| 388996 ||  || — || October 25, 2008 || Socorro || LINEAR || AEO || align=right | 1.4 km || 
|-id=997 bgcolor=#E9E9E9
| 388997 ||  || — || October 21, 2008 || Kitt Peak || Spacewatch || — || align=right | 1.7 km || 
|-id=998 bgcolor=#E9E9E9
| 388998 ||  || — || October 21, 2008 || Kitt Peak || Spacewatch || — || align=right | 2.5 km || 
|-id=999 bgcolor=#E9E9E9
| 388999 ||  || — || October 22, 2008 || Kitt Peak || Spacewatch || — || align=right | 1.2 km || 
|-id=000 bgcolor=#fefefe
| 389000 ||  || — || September 22, 2008 || Mount Lemmon || Mount Lemmon Survey || V || align=right data-sort-value="0.86" | 860 m || 
|}

References

External links 
 Discovery Circumstances: Numbered Minor Planets (385001)–(390000) (IAU Minor Planet Center)

0388